= Low-temperature technology timeline =

The following is a timeline of low-temperature technology and cryogenic technology (refrigeration down to close to absolute zero, i.e. –273.15 °C, −459.67 °F or 0 K). It also lists important milestones in thermometry, thermodynamics, statistical physics and calorimetry, that were crucial in development of low temperature systems.

== Prior to the 19th century ==
- c. 1700 BC – Zimri-Lim, ruler of Mari in Syria commanded the construction of one of the first ice houses near the Euphrates.
- c. 500 BC – The yakhchāl (meaning "ice pit" in Persian) is an ancient Persian type of refrigerator. The structure was formed from a mortar resistant to heat transmission, in the shape of a dome. Snow and ice was stored beneath the ground, effectively allowing access to ice even in hot months and allowing for prolonged food preservation. Often a badgir was coupled with the yakhchal in order to slow the heat loss. Modern refrigerators are still called yakhchal in Persian.
- c. 60 AD – Hero of Alexandria knew of the principle that certain substances, notably air, expand and contract and described a demonstration in which a closed tube partially filled with air had its end in a container of water. The expansion and contraction of the air caused the position of the water/air interface to move along the tube. This was the first established principle of gas behaviour vs temperature, and principle of first thermometers later on. The idea could predate him even more (Empedocles of Agrigentum in his 460 B.C. book On Nature).
- 1396 AD – Ice storage warehouses called "Dong-bing-go-tango" (meaning "east ice storage warehouse" in Korean) and Seo-bing-go ("west ice storage warehouse") were built in Han-Yang (currently Seoul, Korea). The buildings housed ice that was collected from the frozen Han River in January (by lunar calendar). The warehouse was well-insulated, providing the royal families with ice into the summer months. These warehouses were closed in 1898 AD but the buildings are still intact in Seoul.
- 1593 – Galileo Galilei builds a first modern thermoscope. But it is possible the invention was by Santorio Santorio or independently around same time by Cornelis Drebbel. The principle of operation was known in ancient Greece.
- c. 1611–1613 – Francesco Sagredo or Santorio Santorio, put a numerical scale on a thermoscope.
- 1617 – Giuseppe Biancani publishes first clear diagram of thermoscope
- 1638 – Robert Fludd describes thermometer with a scale, using air thermometer principle with column of air and liquid water.
- 1650 – Otto von Guericke designed and built the world's first vacuum pump and created the world's first ever vacuum known as the Magdeburg hemispheres to disprove Aristotle's long-held supposition that 'Nature abhors a vacuum'.
- 1656 – Robert Boyle and Robert Hooke built an air pump on this design.
- 1662 – Boyle's law (gas law relating pressure and volume) is demonstrated using a vacuum pump
- 1665 – Boyle theorizes a minimum temperature in New Experiments and Observations touching Cold.
- 1679 – Denis Papin – safety valve
- 1702 – Guillaume Amontons first calculates absolute zero to be −240 °C using an air thermometer of his own invention (1702), theorizing at this point the gas would reach zero volume and zero pressure.
- 1714 – Daniel Gabriel Fahrenheit invented the first reliable thermometer, using mercury instead of alcohol and water mixtures
- 1724 – Daniel Gabriel Fahrenheit proposes a Fahrenheit scale, which had finer scale and greater reproducibility than competitors.
- 1730 – René Antoine Ferchault de Réaumur invented an alcohol thermometer and temperature scale ultimately proved to be less reliable than Fahrenheit's mercury thermometer.
- 1742 – Anders Celsius proposed a scale with zero at the boiling point and 100 degrees at the freezing point of water. It was later changed to be the other way around, on the input from Swedish academy of science.
- 1755 – William Cullen used a pump to create a partial vacuum over a container of diethyl ether, which then boiled, absorbing heat from the surrounding air.
- 1756 – The first documented public demonstration of artificial refrigeration by William Cullen
- 1782 – Antoine Lavoisier and Pierre-Simon Laplace invent the ice-calorimeter
- 1784 – Gaspard Monge liquefied the first pure gas with Clouet producing liquid sulfur dioxide.
- 1787 – Charles's law (Gas law, relating volume and temperature)
- 1799 – Martin van Marum and Adriaan Paets van Troostwijk compressed ammonia to see if it followed Boyle's law. They found at room temperature and 7 atm gaseous ammonia condensed to a liquid.

== 19th century ==
- 1802 – John Dalton wrote "the reducibility of all elastic fluids of whatever kind, into liquids"
- 1802 – Gay-Lussac's law (Gas law, relating temperature and pressure).
- 1803 – Domestic ice box
- 1803 – Thomas Moore of Baltimore, Md. received a patent on refrigeration.
- 1805 – Oliver Evans designed the first closed circuit refrigeration machine based on the vapor-compression refrigeration cycle.
- 1809 – Jacob Perkins patented the first refrigerating machine
- 1810 – John Leslie freezes water to ice by using an airpump.
- 1811 – Avogadro's law
- 1823 – Michael Faraday liquefied Cl_{2}
- 1824 – Sadi Carnot – the Carnot Cycle
- 1834 – Ideal gas law by Émile Clapeyron
- 1834 – Émile Clapeyron characterizes phase transitions between two phases in form of Clausius–Clapeyron relation.
- 1834 – Jacob Perkins obtained the first patent for a vapor-compression refrigeration system.
- 1834 – Jean-Charles Peltier discovers the Peltier effect
- 1844 – Charles Piazzi Smyth proposes comfort cooling
- c.1850 – Michael Faraday makes a hypothesis that freezing substances increases their dielectric constant.
- 1851 – John Gorrie patented his mechanical refrigeration machine in the US to make ice to cool the air
- 1852 – James Prescott Joule and William Thomson, 1st Baron Kelvin discover Joule–Thomson effect
- 1856 – James Harrison patented an ether liquid-vapour compression refrigeration system and developed the first practical ice-making and refrigeration room for use in the brewing and meat-packing industries of Geelong, Victoria, Australia.
- 1856 – August Krönig simplistic foundation of kinetic theory of gases.
- 1857 – Rudolf Clausius creates a sophisticated theory of gases based including all degrees of freedom, as well derives Clausius–Clapeyron relation from basic principles.
- 1857 – Carl Wilhelm Siemens, the Siemens cycle
- 1858 – Julius Plücker observed for the first time some pumping effect due to electrical discharge.
- 1859 – James Clerk Maxwell determines distribution of velocities and kinetic energies in a gas, and explains emergent property of temperature and heat, and creates a first law of statistical mechanics.
- 1859 – Ferdinand Carré – The first gas absorption refrigeration system using gaseous ammonia dissolved in water (referred to as "aqua ammonia")
- 1862 – Alexander Carnegie Kirk invents the Air cycle machine
- 1864 – Charles Tellier patented a refrigeration system using dimethyl ether
- 1867 – Thaddeus S. C. Lowe patented a refrigeration system using carbon dioxide, and in 1869 made ice making machine using dry carbon dioxide. The same year Lowe bought a steamship and put a compressor based refrigeration device on it for transport of frozen meat.
- 1867 — French immigrant Eugene Dominic Nicolle dissolved ammonia in water to reach a temperature of −20 °C in a sealed room. Together with another new Australian, industrialist Sir Thomas Mort — who in 1867 built the first freezerworks using this idea in Balmain — and with the help of NSW politician, Augustus Morris, overcame the public's mistrust of frozen food by revealing the fact to an audience of the influential (after their state meal) on 2 September, 1875.
- 1869 – Charles Tellier installed a cold storage plant in France.
- 1869 – Thomas Andrews discovers existence of a critical point in fluids.
- 1871 – Carl von Linde built his first ammonia compression machine.
- c.a. 1873 – Van der Waals publishes and proposes a real gas model named later a Van der Waals equation.
- 1875 – Raoul Pictet develops a refrigeration machine using sulphur dioxide to combat high-pressure problems of ammonia in when used in tropical climates (mainly for the purpose of shipping meat).
- 1876 – Carl von Linde patented equipment to liquefy air using the Joule Thomson expansion process and regenerative cooling
- 1877 – Raoul Pictet and Louis Paul Cailletet, working separately, develop two methods to liquefy oxygen.
- 1879 – Bell-Coleman machine
- 1882 – William Soltau Davidson fitted a compression refrigeration unit to the New Zealand vessel Dunedin
- 1883 – Zygmunt Wróblewski condenses experimentally useful quantities of liquid oxygen
- 1885 – Zygmunt Wróblewski published hydrogen's critical temperature as 33 K; critical pressure, 13.3 atmospheres; and boiling point, 23 K.
- 1888 – Loftus Perkins develops the "Arktos" cold chamber for preserving food, using an early ammonia absorption system.
- 1892 – James Dewar invents the vacuum-insulated, silver-plated glass Dewar flask
- 1894 – Marcel Audiffren, a French Cistercian monk, patented a hand-cranked device that did not lose coolant to the atmosphere.
- 1895 – Carl von Linde files for patent protection of the Hampson–Linde cycle for liquefaction of atmospheric air or other gases (approved in 1903).
- 1898 – James Dewar condenses liquid hydrogen by using regenerative cooling and his invention, the vacuum flask.

== 20th century ==
- 1905 – Carl von Linde obtains pure liquid oxygen and nitrogen.
- 1906 – Willis Carrier patents the basis for modern air conditioning.
- 1908 – Heike Kamerlingh Onnes liquifies helium.
- 1911 – Heike Kamerlingh Onnes discloses his research on metallic low-temperature phenomenon characterised by no electrical resistance, calling it superconductivity.
- 1915 – Wolfgang Gaede – the Diffusion pump
- 1920 – Edmund Copeland and Harry Edwards use iso-butane in small refrigerators.
- 1922 – Baltzar von Platen and Carl Munters invent the 3 fluids absorption chiller, exclusively driven by heat.
- 1924 – Fernand Holweck – the Holweck pump
- 1926 – Albert Einstein and Leó Szilárd invent the Einstein refrigerator.
- 1926 – Willem Hendrik Keesom solidifies helium.
- 1926 – General Electric Company introduced the first hermetic compressor refrigerator
- 1929 – David Forbes Keith of Toronto, Ontario, Canada received a patent for the Icy Ball which helped hundreds of thousands of families through the Dirty Thirties.
- 1933 – William Giauque and others – Adiabatic demagnetization refrigeration
- 1937 – Pyotr Leonidovich Kapitsa, John F. Allen, and Don Misener discover superfluidity using helium-4 at 2.2 K
- 1937 – Frans Michel Penning invents a type of cold cathode vacuum gauge known as Penning gauge
- 1944 – Manne Siegbahn, the Siegbahn pump
- 1949 – S.G. Sydoriak, E.R. Grilly, E.F. Hammel, first measurements on pure 3He in the 1 K range
- 1950 – Invention of the so-called Gifford-McMahon cooler by K.W. Taconis (patent US2,567,454)
- 1951 – Heinz London invents the principle of the dilution refrigerator
- 1955 – Willi Becker turbomolecular pump concept
- 1956 – G.K. Walters, W.M. Fairbank, discovery of phase separation in 3He-4He mixtures
- 1957 – Lewis D. Hall, Robert L. Jepsen and John C. Helmer ion pump based on Penning discharge
- 1959 – Kleemenko cycle
- 1960 – Reinvention of the Gifford-McMahon cooler by H.O. McMahon and W.E. Gifford
- 1965 – D.O. Edwards, and others, discovery of finite solubility of 3He in 4He at 0K
- 1965 – P. Das, R. de Bruyn Ouboter, K.W. Taconis, one-shot dilution refrigerator
- 1966 – H.E. Hall, P.J. Ford, K. Thomson, continuous dilution refrigerator
- 1972 – David Lee, Robert Coleman Richardson and Douglas Osheroff discover superfluidity in helium-3 at 0.002 K.
- 1973 – Linear compressor
- 1978 – Laser cooling demonstrated in the groups of Wineland and Dehmelt.
- 1983 – Orifice-type pulse tube refrigerator invented by Mikulin, Tarasov, and Shkrebyonock
- 1986 – Karl Alexander Müller and J. Georg Bednorz discover high-temperature superconductivity
- 1995 – Eric Cornell and Carl Wieman create the first Bose–Einstein condensate, using a dilute gas of Rubidium-87 cooled to 170 nK. They won the Nobel Prize for Physics in 2001 for BEC.
- 1999 – D.J. Cousins and others, dilution refrigerator reaching 1.75 mK
- 1999 – The world record lowest temperature was set at 100 picokelvins (pK), or 0.000 000 000 1 of a kelvin, by cooling the nuclear spins in a piece of rhodium metal.

== 21st century ==
- 2000 – Nuclear spin temperatures below 100 pK were reported for an experiment at the Helsinki University of Technology's Low Temperature Lab in Espoo, Finland. However, this was the temperature of one particular degree of freedom – a quantum property called nuclear spin – not the overall average thermodynamic temperature for all possible degrees in freedom.
- 2014 – Scientists in the CUORE collaboration at the Laboratori Nazionali del Gran Sasso in Italy cooled a copper vessel with a volume of one cubic meter to 0.006 kelvins (−273.144 °C; −459.659 °F) for 15 days, setting a record for the lowest temperature in the known universe over such a large contiguous volume
- 2015 – Experimental physicists at Massachusetts Institute of Technology (MIT) successfully cooled molecules in a gas of sodium potassium to a temperature of 500 nanokelvins, and it is expected to exhibit an exotic state of matter by cooling these molecules a bit further.
- 2015 – A team of atomic physicists from Stanford University used a matter-wave lensing technique to cool a sample of rubidium atoms to an effective temperature of 50 pK along two spatial dimensions.
- 2017 – Cold Atom Laboratory (CAL), an experimental instrument launched to the International Space Station (ISS) in 2018. The instrument creates extremely cold conditions in the microgravity environment of the ISS leading to the formation of Bose Einstein Condensates that are a magnitude colder than those that are created in laboratories on Earth. In this space-based laboratory, up to 20 seconds interaction times and as low as 1 picokelvin ($10^{-12}$ K) temperatures are projected to be achievable, and it could lead to exploration of unknown quantum mechanical phenomena and test some of the most fundamental laws of physics.
- 2021 – a Bose-Einstein condensate was cooled to a record temperature of 38 picokelvin (38e-12 K) in the Bremen drop tower..
- 2022 – A research team at the University of Basel cooled an electronic circuit on a chip to 220 μK using nuclear demagnetization, achieving the lowest measured temperature for an electronic chip at the time and improving on their previous result by more than an order of magnitude.
- 2026 - In November 2026, scientists on the Tiangong Space Station cooled rubidium atoms down to 9.7 picokelvin.

== See also ==
- List of timelines
- Liquefaction of gases
- History of superconductivity
- History of thermodynamics
- Timeline of temperature and pressure measurement technology
- Timeline of thermodynamics, statistical mechanics, and random processes
- Industrial gas
