= Holweck =

Holweck is a German surname and may refer to:

- Fernand Holweck (1890–1941), French physicist
  - Fernand Holweck Medal and Prize, in physics
  - Holweck pump, for producing low pressures
- Frederick George Holweck (1856–1927), German-American Roman Catholic priest and scholar, hagiographer and church historian* Oskar Holweck (1924–2007), German artist and art educator; see Ellen Marx (artist)
