= Cold trap =

Device that condenses specific vapors and gases

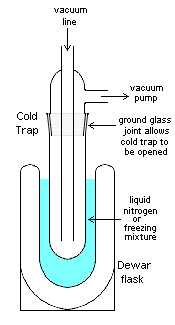
Cold trap immersed in cold medium in Dewar flask. Some workers prefer the opposite arrangement, where vapors flow down the wall of the trap, and are sucked up the inner tube; this reduces blockage.

In vacuum applications, a cold trap is a device that condenses all vapors except the permanent gases (hydrogen, oxygen, and nitrogen) into a liquid or solid. The most common objective is to prevent vapors being evacuated from an experiment from entering a vacuum pump where they would condense and contaminate it. Particularly large cold traps are necessary when removing large amounts of liquid as in freeze drying.

Cold traps also refer to the application of cooled surfaces or baffles to prevent oil vapours from flowing from a pump and into a chamber. In such a case, a baffle or a section of pipe containing a number of cooled vanes, will be attached to the inlet of an existing pumping system. By cooling the baffle, either with a cryogen such as a dry ice mixture, or by use of an electrically driven Peltier element, oil vapour molecules that strike the baffle vanes will condense and thus be removed from the pumped cavity.

== Applications ==
Pumps that use oil either as their working fluid (diffusion pumps), or as their lubricant (mechanical rotary pumps), are often the sources of contamination in vacuum systems. Placing a cold trap at the mouth of such a pump greatly lowers the risk that oil vapours will backstream into the cavity.

Cold traps can also be used for experiments involving vacuum lines such as small-scale very low temperature distillations/condensations. This is accomplished through the use of a coolant such as liquid nitrogen or a freezing mixture of dry ice in acetone or a similar solvent with a low melting point. Liquid nitrogen is only used when dry ice or other cryogenic approaches will not condense the desired gasses since liquid nitrogen will also condense oxygen. Any oxygen gas content in the vacuum line or any leak in the vacuum line will result in liquid oxygen mixed with the target vapors, often with explosive results.

When performed on a larger scale, this technique is called freeze-drying, and the cold trap is referred to as the condenser.

Cold traps are also used in cryopump systems to generate hard vacua by condensing the major constituents of the atmosphere (nitrogen, oxygen, carbon dioxide and water) into their liquid or solid forms.

An igloo or other snow bivouac may exploit the same principle – confinement of denser cool air within an impermeable lower volume – to reduce cold air reaching the occupants through use of a sump or cill around a raised sleeping platform within.

== Hazards ==
Care should be taken when using a cold trap not to condense oxygen gas into the cold trap, visible as light blue liquid. Liquid oxygen is potentially explosive, and this is especially true if the trap has been used to trap solvent. Oxygen can be condensed into a cold trap if a pump has sucked air through the trap when the trap is very cold, e.g. when cooled with liquid nitrogen. Besides oxygen, many hazardous gases emitted in reactions, e.g. sulfur dioxide, chloromethane, condense into cold traps.

== Construction ==

Cold traps (C in the figure) usually consist of two parts: The bottom is a large, thick round tube with ground-glass joints (B in the figure), and the second is a cap (A in the figure), also with ground-glass connections. The length of the tube is usually selected so that, when assembled, the total reached is about half the length of the tube.

== Arrangement ==
Cold traps should be assembled such that the down tube is connected to the source of gas whilst the cap is connected to the source of vacuum. Reversing this, connecting the down tube to the source of vacuum, places the inlet of the vacuum directly above the condensate, increasing the chances of vapour phase condensate moving up the (uncooled) down tube (towards the pump) or, should the trap begin to fill to an appreciable volume, liquid phase condensate being pulled into the pump.

== See also ==
- Sublimation
- Cold finger
