= Titanium sublimation pump =

Type of vacuum pump

A titanium sublimation pump (TSP) is a type of vacuum pump used to remove residual gas in ultra-high vacuum systems, maintaining the vacuum.

== Principle of operation ==
Its construction and principle of operation is simple. It consists of a titanium filament through which a high current (typically around 40 A) is passed periodically. This current causes the filament to reach the sublimation temperature of titanium, and hence the surrounding chamber walls become coated with a thin film of clean titanium. Since clean titanium is very reactive, components of the residual gas in the chamber which collide with the chamber wall are likely to react and to form a stable, solid product. Thus the gas pressure in the chamber is reduced.

After some time, the titanium film will no longer be clean and hence the effectiveness of the pump is reduced. Therefore, after a certain time, the titanium filament should be heated again, and a new film of titanium re-deposited on the chamber wall. Since the time taken for the titanium film to react depends on a number of factors (such as the composition of the residual gas, the temperature of the chamber and the total pressure), the period between successive sublimations requires some consideration. Typically, the operator does not know all of these factors, so the sublimation period is estimated according to the total pressure and by observing the effectiveness of the outcome. Some TSP controllers use a signal from the pressure gauge to estimate the appropriate period.

Since the TSP filament has a finite lifetime, TSPs commonly have multiple filaments to allow the operator to switch to a new one without needing to open the chamber. Replacing used filaments can then be combined with other maintenance jobs.

The effectiveness of the TSP depends on a number of factors. Amongst the most critical are; the area of the titanium film, the temperature of the chamber walls and the composition of the residual gas. The area is typically maximised when considering where to mount the TSP. The reactivity of the new titanium film is increased at lower temperatures, so it is desirable to cool the relevant part of the chamber, typically using liquid nitrogen. However, due to the cost of the nitrogen and the need to ensure a continuous supply, TSPs are commonly operated at room temperature. Finally the residual gas composition is important – typically the pump works well with the more reactive components (such as CO and O_{2}), but is very ineffective at pumping inert components such as the noble gases and methane (CH_{4}). Therefore, TSP must be used in conjunction with other pumps.

Other pumps which use exactly the same working principle, but using something other than titanium as a source are also relatively common. This family of pumps are usually called getter pumps or getters and typically consist of metals which are reactive with the components of the residual gas which are not pumped by the TSP. By choosing a number of such sources, most constituents of the residual gas, except for the noble gases, can be targeted.

== Practical considerations ==
When mounting the TSP in the chamber, a number of important considerations must be made. First, it is desirable that the filament can deposit on a large area. However, one must take care that the titanium is not deposited onto anything it can damage. For example, electrical feed-throughs containing ceramic insulators will fail if the titanium forms a conducting film which bridges the ceramic insulator. Samples may become contaminated by titanium if they have line-of-sight to the pump. Also, titanium is a very hard material, so titanium film which builds up on the inside of the chamber may form flakes which fall into mechanical components (typically turbomolecular pumps and valves) and damage them.

Many chambers containing TSPs also have an ion pump. Often the ion pump provides a good location for the TSP, and some manufacturers promote the use of both types together. Furthermore, TSPs have been shown to be effective against the regurgitation effects of ion pumps.
