= INFICON =

Manufacturing company

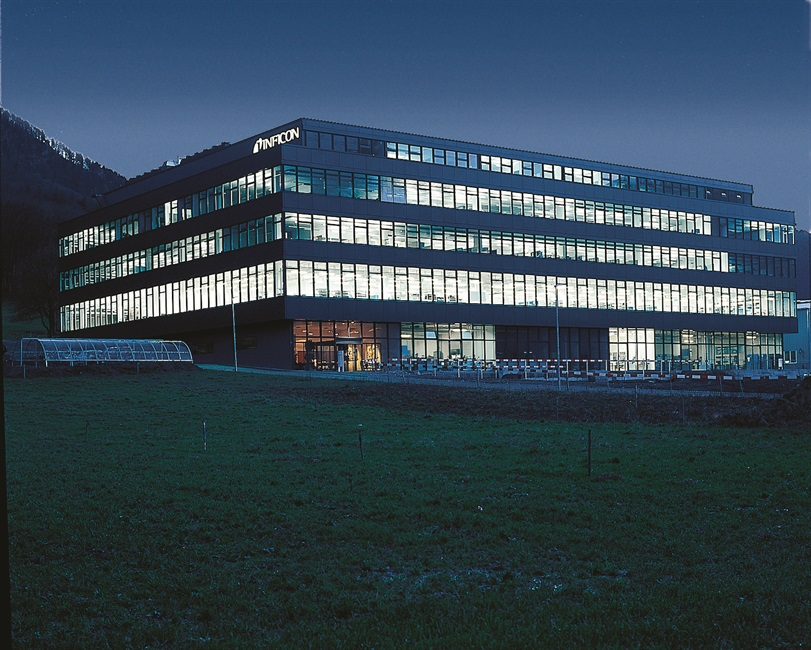
- INFICON office and manufacturing facility in Balzers, Liechtenstein
- Type: Public
- Traded as: SIX: IFCN
- ISIN: CH0011029946
- Industry: Electrical Engineering
- Founded: December 1969; 56 years ago (original iteration) in Syracuse, New York, United States; July 2000; 26 years ago (current iteration) in Switzerland
- Headquarters: Bad Ragaz, SG, Switzerland
- Area served: Worldwide
- Key people: Dr. Beat E. Lüthi (CoB); Oliver Wyrsch (CEO); Dimitrij Lisak (CFO)
- Products: Leak Detectors; Service Tools for HVAC/R; Service Tools for Automotive; Chemical Detection and Monitoring (GCMS/GC/FID); Quartz Monitor Crystals; Thin Film Deposition; Controllers and Monitors; Electron Beam Gun Control; Residual Gas Analyzers; Mass Spectrometers; Gas Concentration Monitor; RF Sensing Technology; FabGuard® Software; Vacuum Feedthroughs; Vacuum Components; Vacuum Gauge Controllers and Accessories; Wide Range Vacuum Gauges; High Precision Vacuum Gauges; Leybold Vacuum Compatible Transmitters
- Revenue: ▲$674.0 million(2025); $671.0 million(2024); $673.7 million(2023); $581.3 million(2022); $515.8 million(2021); $397.8 million(2020)
- Number of employees: 1730 (Dec 2025)
- Parent: INFICON Holding AG
- Website: inficon.com

INFICON (Instruments For Intelligent Control) is a Swiss company specializing in the development and manufacturing of instruments, sensor technology and process control software for the semiconductor and vacuum-coating industries. They supply instruments for gas leak detection in refrigeration, air conditioning, the automotive industry and for the analysis and identification of toxic chemicals. Originating as an American company before its buyout by European competitors, INFICON was re-established as an independent company in Switzerland following a series of corporate restructurings, with its new headquarters in Bad Ragaz.

The modern company has manufacturing facilities in Europe, the United States and China. INFICON has subsidiaries in China, Denmark, Finland, France, Germany, Italy, Japan, South Korea, Liechtenstein, Malaysia, Mexico, Singapore, Sweden, Switzerland, Taiwan, the United Kingdom and the United States.

== History ==
Inficon was founded in Syracuse, New York by a group of scientists and engineers from General Electric (GE) and Syracuse University (SU), who developed a halogen leak detector in December 1969.

In January 1976, Inficon was acquired by Leybold-Heraeus GmbH, a vacuum technology company. Due to this acquisition, Inficon became known as Inficon Leybold-Heraeus.

In 1987, Leybold-Heraeus GmbH, the parent company of Inficon, was purchased by Degussa AG, and the name was changed to Leybold AG. At this point, Inficon Leybold-Heraeus became Leybold Inficon, Inc.

In 1993, Oerlikon-Bührle Holding AG (OBH), which owned Balzers AG, reached a deal to buy Leybold AG from Degussa AG. Formed in 1994, Balzers and Leybold Holding AG became the world's largest vacuum and surface technology company as a result of this purchase. Leybold Inficon, Inc. of Syracuse, along with Balzers Instruments of Liechtenstein and two Leybold instrument groups of Germany, then became Balzers and Leybold Instrumentation (BLI).

In 1998, the Oerlikon-Bührle Group was split up and the core business was renamed Unaxis.

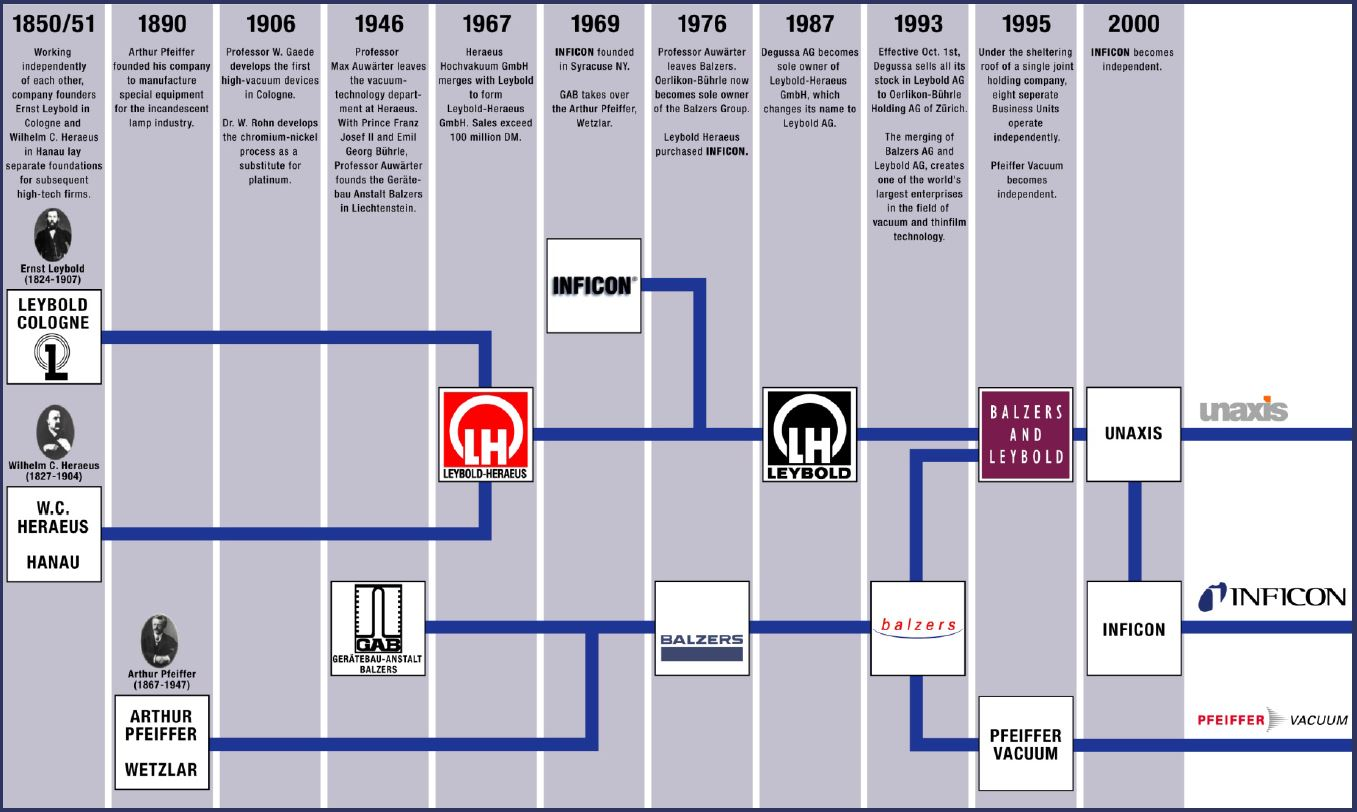
History Timeline for INFICON

In July 2000, Balzers AG and Leybold AG became a part of Unaxis and the instrument group was spun off, forming INFICON Holding AG in Switzerland. Combined with Leybold Inficon, Inc. the three instrument groups then became INFICON. On November 9, 2000, INFICON joined the Nasdaq and SIX Swiss Exchange with a public offering under the ticker symbol "IFCN".

In February 2005, INFICON delisted its stock from Nasdaq, but continues to trade on the SIX Swiss Exchange to this day.

== Acquisitions ==
- In February 2006, Electro Dynamics Crystal Corp. was acquired and began operating as a subsidiary with the name INFICON EDC, Inc.
- In May 2007, the company acquired Maxtek Inc.
- In December 2007, INFICON acquired Sigma Instruments Inc.
- In February 2016, US based, InstruTech Inc., was acquired by INFICON.
- In October 2018, Final Phase Systems LLC, assets of a software developer, and Techno-Tools Corp., assets of a manufacturer of hand-held leak detectors, were acquired by INFICON.
