= MPPE =

MPPE may refer to:

- Microsoft Point-to-Point Encryption, a data encryption protocol
- Modified polyphenyl ether, a type of phenyl ether polymer
