= Polyphenyl ether =

Class of polymers

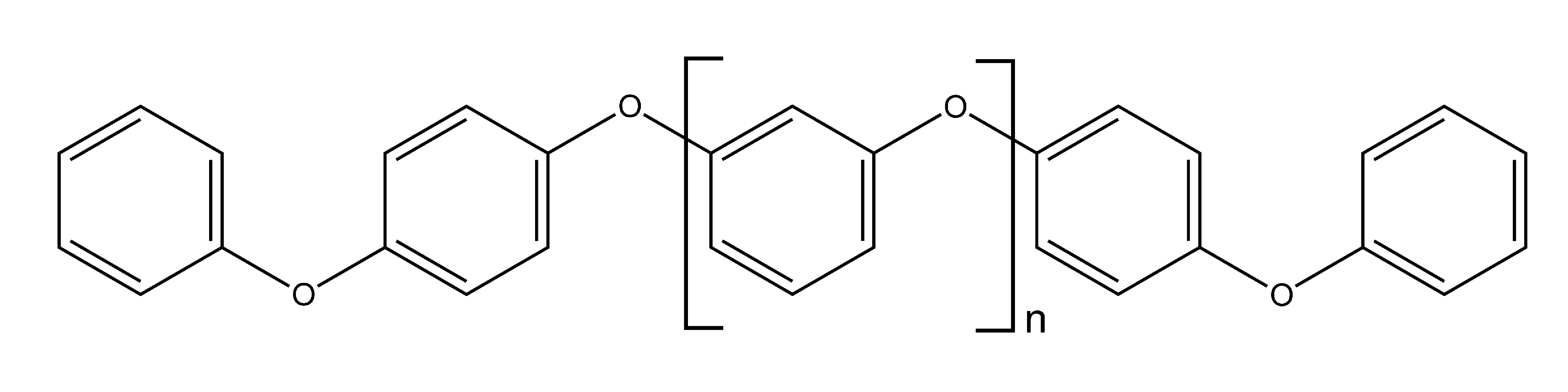
Figure 1: Representative Structure of Polyphenyl Ether (PPE)

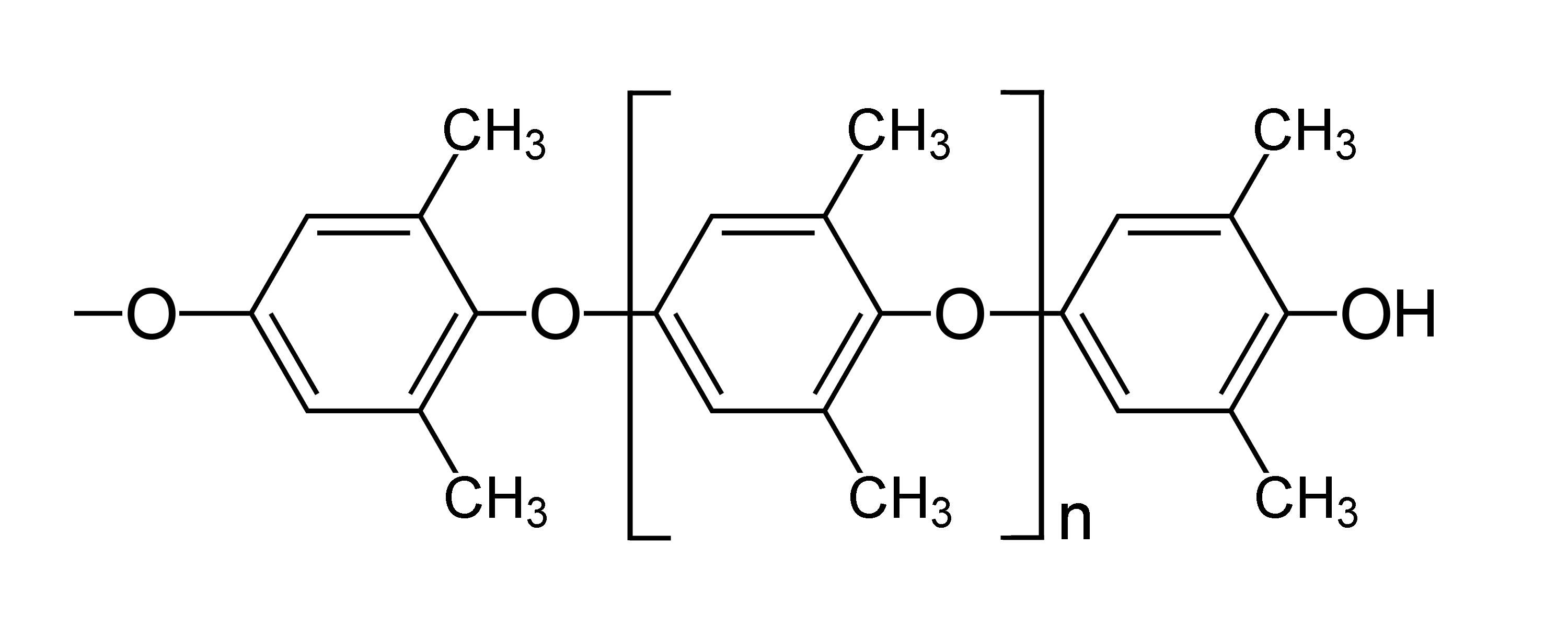
Figure 2: Representative Structure of Polyphenylene Oxide (PPO)

Phenyl ether polymers are a class of polymers that contain a phenoxy or a thiophenoxy group as the repeating group in ether linkages. Commercial phenyl ether polymers belong to two chemical classes: polyphenyl ethers (PPEs) and polyphenylene oxides (PPOs). The phenoxy groups in the former class of polymers do not contain any substituents whereas those in the latter class contain 2 to 4 alkyl groups on the phenyl ring. The structure of an oxygen-containing PPE is provided in Figure 1 and that of a 2, 6-xylenol derived PPO is shown in Figure 2. Either class can have the oxygen atoms attached at various positions around the rings.

== Structure and synthesis ==
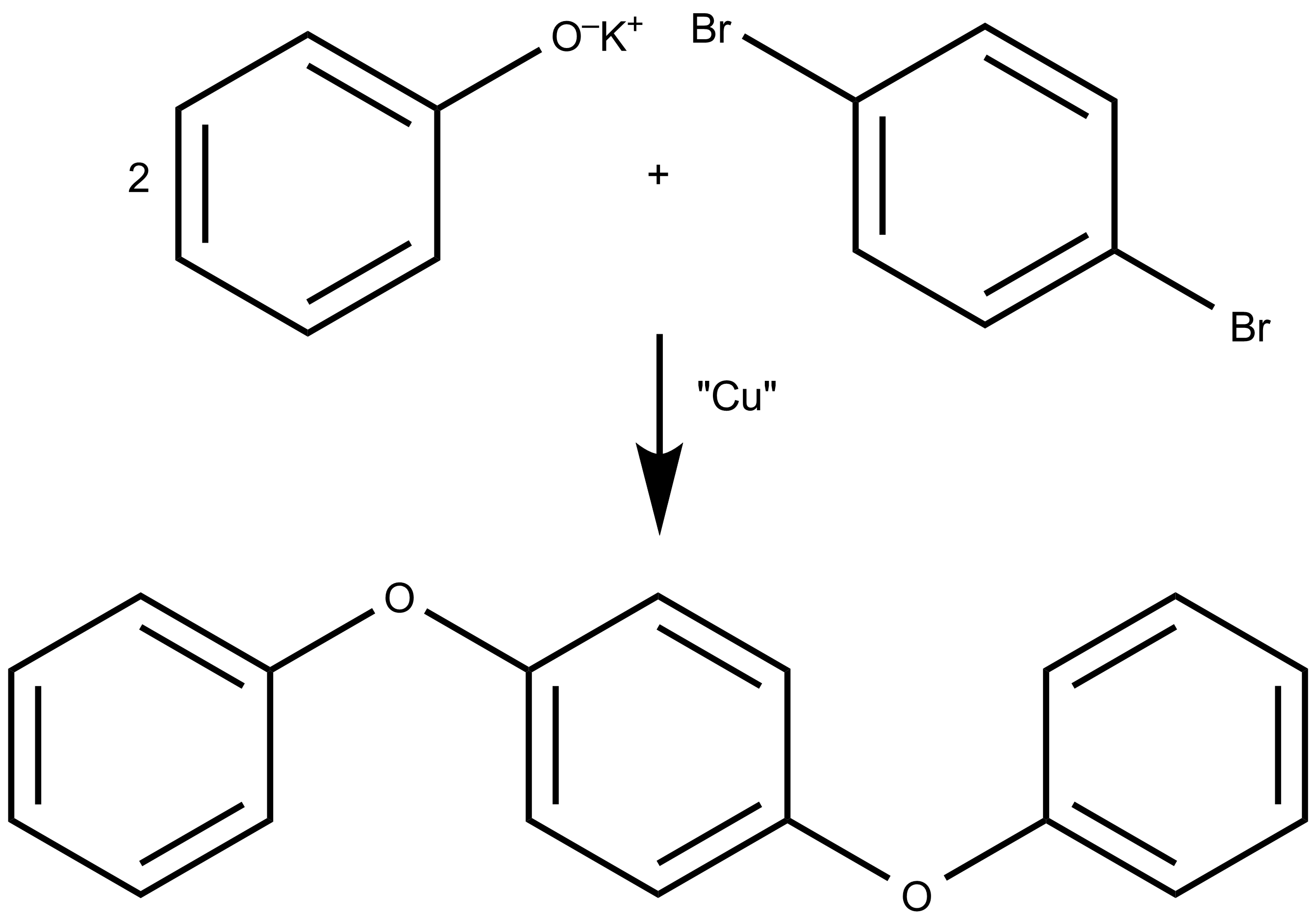
Figure 3: Ullmann Ether Synthesis of 4R2E (p-diphenoxybenzene), a simple polyphenyl ether

Figure 4: Structure of 2R1E diphenyl ether

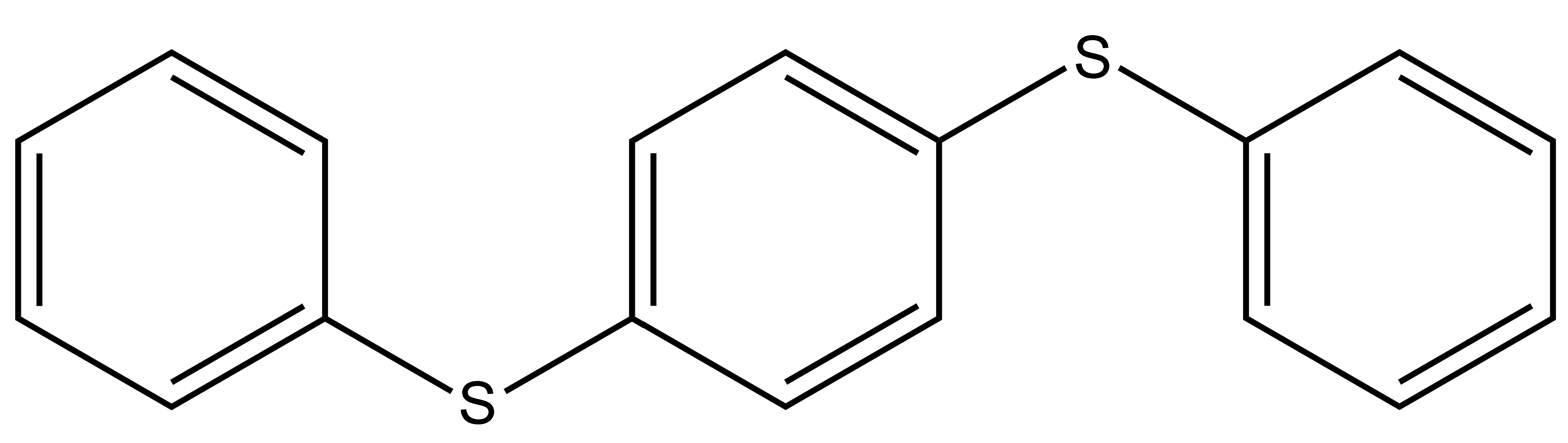
Figure 5: structure of 3R2TE polyphenyl thioether

The proper name for a phenyl ether polymer is poly(phenyl ether) or polyphenyl polyether, but the name polyphenyl ether is widely accepted. Polyphenyl ethers (PPEs) are obtained by repeated application of the Ullmann Ether Synthesis: reaction of an alkali-metal phenate with a halogenated benzene catalyzed by copper.

PPEs of up to 6 phenyl rings, both oxy and thio ethers, are commercially available. See Table 1. They are characterized by indicating the substitution pattern of each ring, followed by the number of phenyl rings and the number of ether linkages. Thus, the structure in Figure 1 with n equal to 1 is identified as pmp5P4E, indicating para, meta, para substitution of the three middle rings, a total of 5 rings, and 4 ether linkages. Meta substitution of the aryl rings in these materials is most common and often desired. Longer chain analogues with up to 10 benzene rings are also known.

The simplest member of the phenyl ether family is diphenyl ether (DPE), also called diphenyl oxide, the structure of which is provided in Figure 4. Low molecular weight polyphenyl ethers and thioethers are used in a variety of applications, and include high-vacuum devices, optics, electronics, and in high-temperature and radiation-resistant fluids and greases. Figure 5 shows the structure of the sulfur analogue of 3-R polyphenyl ether shown in Figure 3.

Table 1: commercial polyphenyl ether products (PPEs)
Common and trade name	Chemical name
Six-ring polyphenyl ether (6P5E); trade name: OS-138	Bis[m-(m-phenoxyphenoxy) phenyl] ether
Five-ring polyphenyl ether (5P4E); trade name: OS-124	m-Bis(m-phenoxyphenoxy)benzene
Four-ring polyphenyl ether (4P3E); trade name: MCS-210	Bis (m-phenoxyphenyl) ether
Three- and four-ring oxy- and thioethers; trade name: MCS-293	Thiobis[phenoxybenzene] and bis (phenylmercapto)benzene
Three-ring polyphenyl ether (3P2E); trade name: MCS-2167	m-Diphenoxybenzene
Two-ring diphenyl ether (2P1E)	Diphenyl ether, diphenyl oxide, phenoxybenzene

== Physical properties ==
Typical physical properties of polyphenyl ethers are provided in Table 2. Physical properties of a particular PPE depend upon the number of aromatic rings, their substitution pattern, and whether it is an ether or a thioether. In the case of products of mixed structures, properties are hard to predict from only the structural features; hence, they must be determined via measurement.

The important attributes of PPEs include their thermal and oxidative stability and stability in the presence of ionizing radiation. PPEs have the disadvantage of having somewhat high pour points. For example, PPEs that contain two and three benzene rings are actually solids at room temperatures. The melting points of the ordinarily solid PPEs are lowered if they contain more m-phenylene rings, alkyl groups, or are mixtures of isomers. PPEs that contain only o- and p-substituted rings have the highest melting points.

Table 2: physical properties of polyphenyl ethers
Polyphenyl ether	Appearance	Pour point (°C; °F)	Thermal stability (°C; °F)	Viscosity (cSt), at 100 °F (38 °C)	Viscosity (cSt), at 210 °F (99 °C)
6-ring 6P5E	Clear liquid	10; 50	447; 836	2000	25
5-ring 5P4E	Clear liquid	4.5; 40	453; 847	360	13
4-ring 4P3E	Clear liquid	−12; 10	441; 825	70	6
3- and 4-ring oxythio	Hazy liquid	−29; −20	367; 693	25	4
3-ring 3P2E	Solid	-	427; 800	12	3
2-ring 2P1E	Solid	-	316; >600	2.4	1.6

=== Thermo-oxidative stability ===
PPEs have excellent high temperature properties and good oxidation stability. With respect to volatilities, p-derivatives have the lowest volatilities, and the o-derivatives have the highest volatilities. The opposite is true for flash points and fire points. Spontaneous ignition temperatures of polyphenyl ethers lie between 550 and 595 °C (1,022 and 1,103 °F), alkyl substitution reduces this value by ~50 °C (122 °F). PPEs are compatible with most metals and elastomers that are commonly used in high-temperature applications. They typically swell common seal materials.

Oxidation stability of un-substituted PPEs is quite good, partly because they lack easily oxidizable carbon-hydrogen bonds. Thermal decomposition temperature, as measured by the isoteniscope procedure, is between 440 and 465 °C (824 and 869 °F).

=== Radiation stability ===
Ionizing radiation affects all organic compounds, causing a change in their properties because radiation disrupts covalent bonds that are most prevalent in organic compounds. One result of ionization is that the organic molecules disproportionate to form smaller hydrocarbon molecules as well as larger hydrocarbons molecules. This is reflected by increased evaporation loss, lowering of the flash and fire points, and increased viscosity. Other chemical reactions caused by radiation include oxidation and isomerization. The former leads to increased acidity, corrosivity, and coke formation; the latter causes a change in viscosity and volatility.

PPEs have extremely high radiation resistance. Of all classes of synthetic lubricants (with the possible exception of perfluoropolyethers) the polyphenyl ethers are the most radiation resistant. Excellent radiation stability of PPEs can be ascribed to the limited number of ionizable carbon-carbon and carbon-hydrogen bonds. In one study, the performance of PPE under the influence of 1×10^{11} ergs/gram of radiation at 99 °C (210 °F) was compared with synthetic ester, synthetic hydrocarbon, and silicone fluids. PPE showed a viscosity increase of only 35%, while all other fluids showed a viscosity increase of 1700% and gelled. Further tests have shown PPEs to be resistant to gamma and associated neutron radiation dosages of 1×10^{10} erg/g at temperatures up to 315 °C (599 °F).

=== Surface tension ===
PPEs have high surface tension; hence these fluids have a lower tendency to wet metal surfaces. The surface tension of the commercially available 5R4E is 49.9 dynes/cm, one of the highest in pure organic liquids. This property is useful in applications where migration of the lubricant into the surrounding environment must be avoided.

== Applications ==
While originally PPEs were developed for use in extreme environments that were experienced in aerospace applications, they are now used in other applications requiring low volatility and excellent thermo-oxidative and ionizing radiation stability. Such applications include use as diffusion pump fluids; high vacuum fluids; and in formulating jet engine lubricants, high-temperature hydraulic lubricants and greases, and heat transfer fluids. In addition, because of excellent optical properties these fluids have found use in optical devices.

=== Ultra-high-vacuum fluids ===
Vacuum pumps are devices that remove gases from an enclosed space to greatly reduce pressure. Oil diffusion pumps in combination with a fore pump are amongst the most popular. Diffusion pumps use a high boiling liquid of low vapor pressure to create a high-speed jet that strikes the gaseous molecules in the system to be evacuated and direct them into space that is being evacuated by the fore pump. A good diffusion fluid must therefore reflect low vapor pressure, high flash point, high thermal and oxidative stability and chemical resistance. If the diffusion pump is operating in the proximity of ionizing radiation source, good radiation stability is also desired.

Data presented in Table 3 demonstrates polyphenyl ether to be superior to other fluids that are commonly used in diffusion pumps. PPEs help achieve the highest vacuum of 4×10^{−10} torr at 25 °C. Such high vacuums are necessary in equipment such as electron microscopes, mass spectrometers and that used for various surface physics studies. Vacuum pumps are also used in the production of electric lamps, vacuum tubes, and cathode ray tubes (CRTs), semiconductor processing, and vacuum engineering.

Table 3: diffusion fluid property comparison
Fluid property	Polyphenyl ether SANTOVAC 5	Silicone Dow Corning	Hydrocarbon oil Apiezon
Vapor pressure, Torr at 25 °C	4×10^{−10}	2×10^{−8}	5×10^{−6}
Molecular weight	446	484	420
Density at 25 °C	1.20	1.07	0.87
Flash point, °C	288	221	243
Boiling point at 1.3 mbar, °C	295	223	220
Viscosity (cSt) at 25 °C	1000	40	135
Viscosity (cSt) at 100 °C	12.0	4.3	7.0
Surface tension, dynes/cm	49.9	30.5	30.5
Refractive index at 25 °C, 589 nm	1.67	1.56	1.48
Thermal stability	Excellent	Good	Poor
Oxidation resistance	Excellent	Excellent	Poor-fair
Chemical resistance	Excellent	Good	Poor
Radiation resistance	Excellent	Good	Fair

=== Electronic connector lubricants ===
5R4E PPE has a surface tension of 49.9 dynes/cm, which is amongst the highest in pure organic liquids. Because of this, this PPE and the other PPEs do not effectively wet metal surfaces. This property is useful when migration of a lubricant from one part of the equipment to another part must be avoided, such as in certain electronic devices. A thin film of polyphenyl ether on a surface is not a thin contiguous film as one would envision, but rather comprises tiny droplets. This PPE property tends to keep the film stationary, or at least to cause it to remain in the area where the lubrication is needed, rather than migrating away by spreading and forming a new surface. As a result, contamination of other components and equipment, which do not require a lubricant, is avoided. The high surface tension of PPEs, therefore, makes them useful in lubricating electronic contacts.

Polyphenyl ether lubricants have a 30-year history of commercial service for connectors with precious and base metal contacts in telecom, automotive, aerospace, instrumentation and general-purpose applications. In addition to maintaining the current flow and providing long-term lubrication, PPEs offer protection to connectors against aggressive acidic and oxidative environments. By providing a protective surface film, polyphenyl ethers not only protect connectors against corrosion but also against vibration-related wear and abrasion that leads to fretting wear. The devices that benefit from the specialized properties of PPEs include cell phones, printers, and a variety of other electronic appliances. The protection lasts for decades or for the life of the equipment.

=== Optics ===
Polyphenyl ethers (PPEs) possess good optical clarity, a high refractive index, and other beneficial optical properties. Because of these, PPEs have the ability to meet the rigorous performance demands of signal processing in advanced photonics systems. Optical clarity of PPEs resembles that of the other optical polymers, that is, they have refractive indices of between 1.5 and 1.7 and provide good propagation of light between approximately 400 nm and 1700 nm. Close refractive index (RI) matching between materials is important for proper propagation of light through them. Because of the ease of RI matching, PPEs are used in many optical devices as optical fluids. Extreme resistance to ionizing radiation gives PPEs an added advantage in the manufacture of solar cells and solid-state UV/blue emitters and telecommunication equipment made from high-index glasses and semiconductors.

=== High-temperature and radiation-resistant lubricants ===
PPEs, being of excellent thermo-oxidative stability and radiation resistance, have found extensive use in high temperature applications that also require radiation resistance. In addition, PPEs demonstrate better wear control and load-carrying ability than mineral oils, especially when used in bearings.

PPEs were developed for use in jet engines that involved high speed-related frictional temperatures of as high as 320 °C (608 °F). While the use of PPEs in lubricating jet engines has somewhat subsided due to their higher cost, they are still used in some aerospace applications. PPEs are also used as base fluids for radiation-resistant greases used in nuclear power plant mechanisms. PPEs and their derivatives have also found use as vapor phase lubricants in gas turbines and custom bearings, and wherever extreme environmental conditions exist. Vapor phase lubrication is achieved by heating the liquid lubricant above its boiling point. The resultant vapors are then transported to the hot bearing surface. If the temperatures of the bearing surface are kept below the lubricant’s boiling point, the vapors re-condense to provide liquid lubrication.

Polyphenyl ether technology can also provide superior fire safety and fatigue life, depending on the specific bearing design. In this application, PPEs have the advantage of providing lubrication both as a liquid at low temperatures and as a vapor at temperatures above 315 °C (599 °F). Due to the low volatility and excellent high-temperature thermo-oxidative stability, PPEs have also found use as a lubricant for chains used in and around kilns, metal fabrication plants, and glass molding and manufacturing equipment. In these high-temperature applications, PPEs do not form any sludge and hard deposits. The low soft-carbon residue that is left behind is removed easily by wiping. PPEs' low volatility, low flammability, and good thermodynamic properties make them ideally suited for use as heat transfer fluids and in heat sink applications as well.

== Polyphenylene oxides (PPOs) ==
These polymers are made through oxidative coupling of substituted phenol in the presence of oxygen and copper and amine containing catalysts, such as cuprous bromide and pyridine. See Figure 2 for the PPO structure. PPO polymers can be classified as plastic resins. They and their composites with polystyrene, glass, and nylon are used as high-strength, moisture-resistant engineering plastics in a number of industries, including computer, telecommunication, and automotive parts. PPOs are marketed by SABIC Innovative Plastics under the trademarked name of Noryl.
