= Diffusion pump =

High vacuum pump

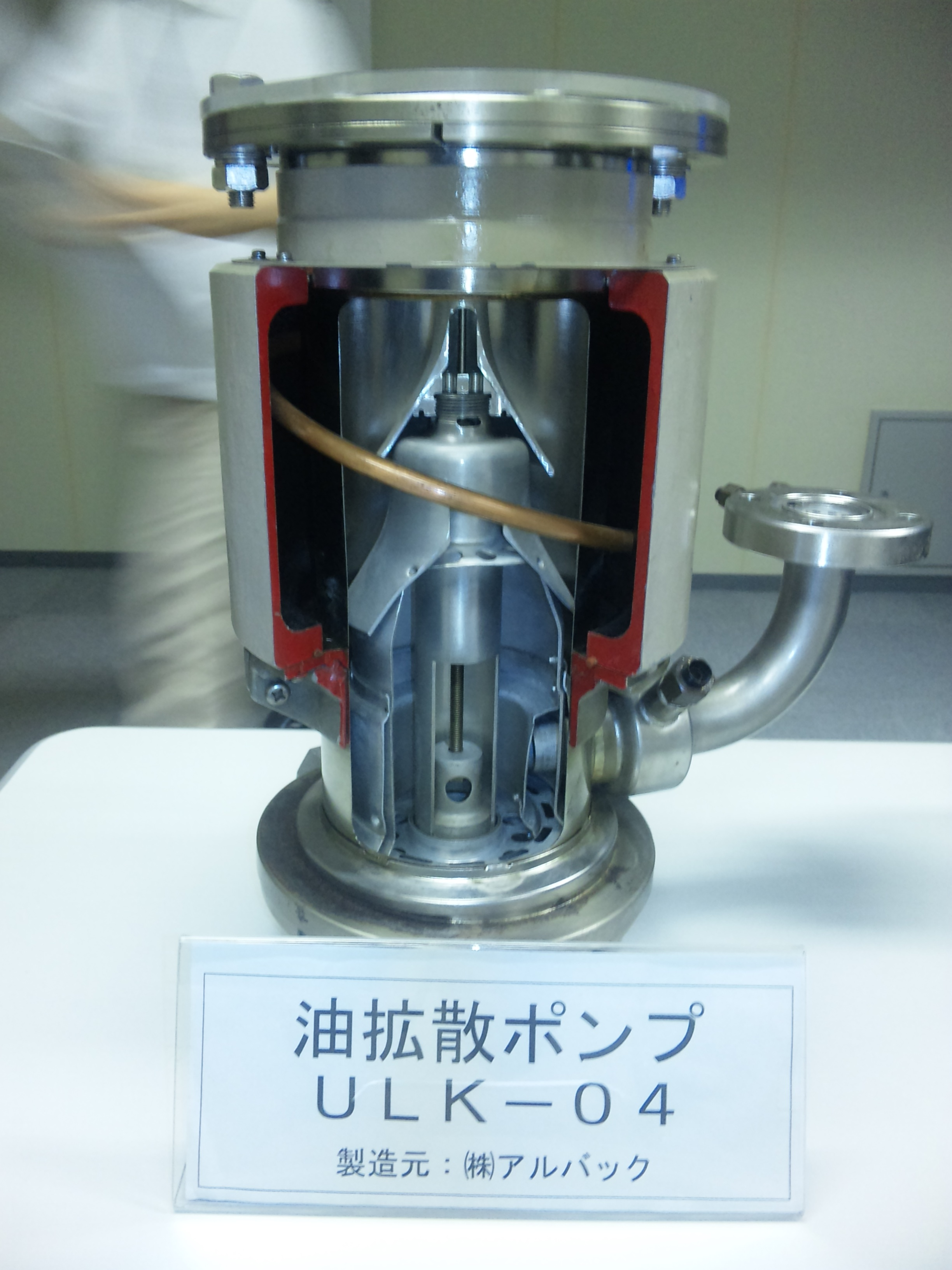
Ulvac oil diffusion pump cutaway

Diffusion pumps are high-vacuum pumps that use high-speed vapor jets to direct gas molecules to the exhaust. Invented by Wolfgang Gaede in 1915, they are used to produce high and ultra-high vacuums. Because they cannot discharge directly into the atmosphere, they require a mechanical backing pump.

The original design used mercury as the working fluid. The design was subsequently improved by Irving Langmuir. Modern diffusion pumps typically use silicone, hydrocarbon, or polyphenyl ether oils as working fluids.

A major disadvantage of diffusion pumps is the tendency of the working fluid to backstream into the vacuum chamber, potentially contaminating sensitive equipment.

== History ==
In the late 19th century, most vacuums were created using a Sprengel pump, which had the advantage of being very simple to operate, and capable of achieving quite good vacuum given enough time. Compared to later pumps, however, the pumping speed was very slow, and the vapor pressure of the liquid mercury limited the ultimate vacuum.

Following his invention of the molecular pump, Wolfgang Gaede invented the diffusion pump in 1915, and originally used elemental mercury as the working fluid. After its invention, the design was quickly commercialized by Leybold. It was then improved by Irving Langmuir and W. Crawford. C.R. Burch described the possibility of using silicone oil in 1928.

== Oil diffusion pumps ==
An oil diffusion pump is used to achieve higher vacuum (lower pressure) than is possible by use of positive displacement pumps alone. Although its use has been mainly associated within the high-vacuum range, down to 1×10^{−12} bar (1×10^{−7} Pa), diffusion pumps today can produce pressures approaching 10^{−13} bar when properly used with modern fluids and accessories. The features that make the diffusion pump attractive for high and ultra-high vacuum use are its high pumping speed for all gases and low cost per unit pumping speed when compared with other types of pump used in the same vacuum range. Diffusion pumps cannot discharge directly into the atmosphere, so a mechanical forepump is typically used to maintain an outlet pressure around 10^{−4} bar.

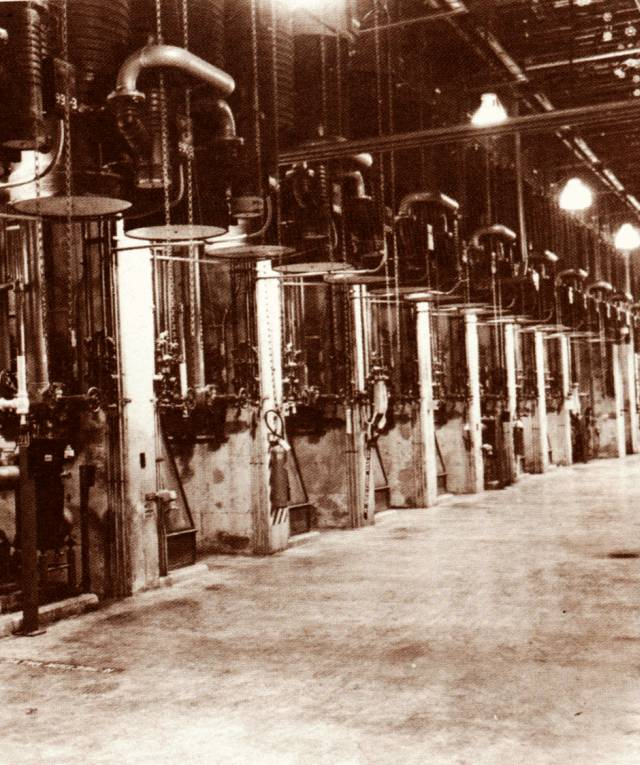
Diffusion pumps used on the Calutron mass spectrometers during the Manhattan Project, visible as black cylinders in the upper half of the image

Diagram of an oil diffusion pump

The oil diffusion pump is operated with an oil of low vapor pressure. The high-speed jet is generated by boiling the fluid and directing the vapor through a jet assembly. The oil is gaseous when entering the nozzles. Within the nozzles, the flow changes from laminar to supersonic and molecular. Often, several jets are used in series to enhance the pumping action. The outside of the diffusion pump is cooled using air flow, water lines, or a water-filled jacket. As the vapor jet hits the outer cooled shell of the diffusion pump, the working fluid condenses and is recovered and directed back to the boiler. The pumped gases continue flowing to the base of the pump at increased pressure, flowing out through the diffusion pump outlet, where they are compressed to ambient pressure by the secondary mechanical forepump and exhausted.

Unlike turbomolecular pumps and cryopumps, diffusion pumps have no moving parts and as a result are quite durable and reliable. They can function over pressure ranges of 10^{−13} to 10^{−5} bar. They are driven only by convection and thus have a very low energy efficiency.

One major disadvantage of diffusion pumps is the tendency to backstream oil into the vacuum chamber. This oil can contaminate surfaces inside the chamber, or upon contact with hot filaments or electrical discharges may result in carbonaceous or siliceous deposits. Due to backstreaming, oil diffusion pumps are not suitable for use with highly sensitive analytical equipment or other applications which require an extremely clean vacuum environment, but mercury diffusion pumps may be in the case of ultra-high-vacuum chambers used for metal deposition. Cold traps and baffles are often used to minimize backstreaming, although this results in some loss of pumping speed.

The oil of a diffusion pump cannot be exposed to the atmosphere when hot. If this occurs, the oil will oxidise and must be replaced. If a fire occurs, the smoke and residue may contaminate other parts of the system.

== Oil types ==
=== Silicone oils ===
The most common silicone oils used in diffusion pumps are trisiloxanes, which contain the chemical group Si-O-Si-O-Si, to which various phenyl groups or methyl groups are attached. These are available as the so-called 702 and 703 blends, which were formerly manufactured by Dow Corning. These can be further separated into 704 and 705 oils, which are made up of the isomers of tetraphenyl tetramethyl trisiloxane and pentaphenyl trimethyl trisiloxane, respectively.

=== Hydrocarbon oils ===
The least expensive diffusion pump oils are based on hydrocarbons that have been purified by double-distillation. Compared with the other fluids, they have higher vapor pressure, so are usually limited to a pressure of 10^{−9} bar. They are also the most likely to burn or explode if exposed to oxidizers.

For pumping reactive species, usually a polyphenyl-ether-based oil is used. These oils are the most chemical and heat resistant type of diffusion pump oil.

== Steam ejectors ==
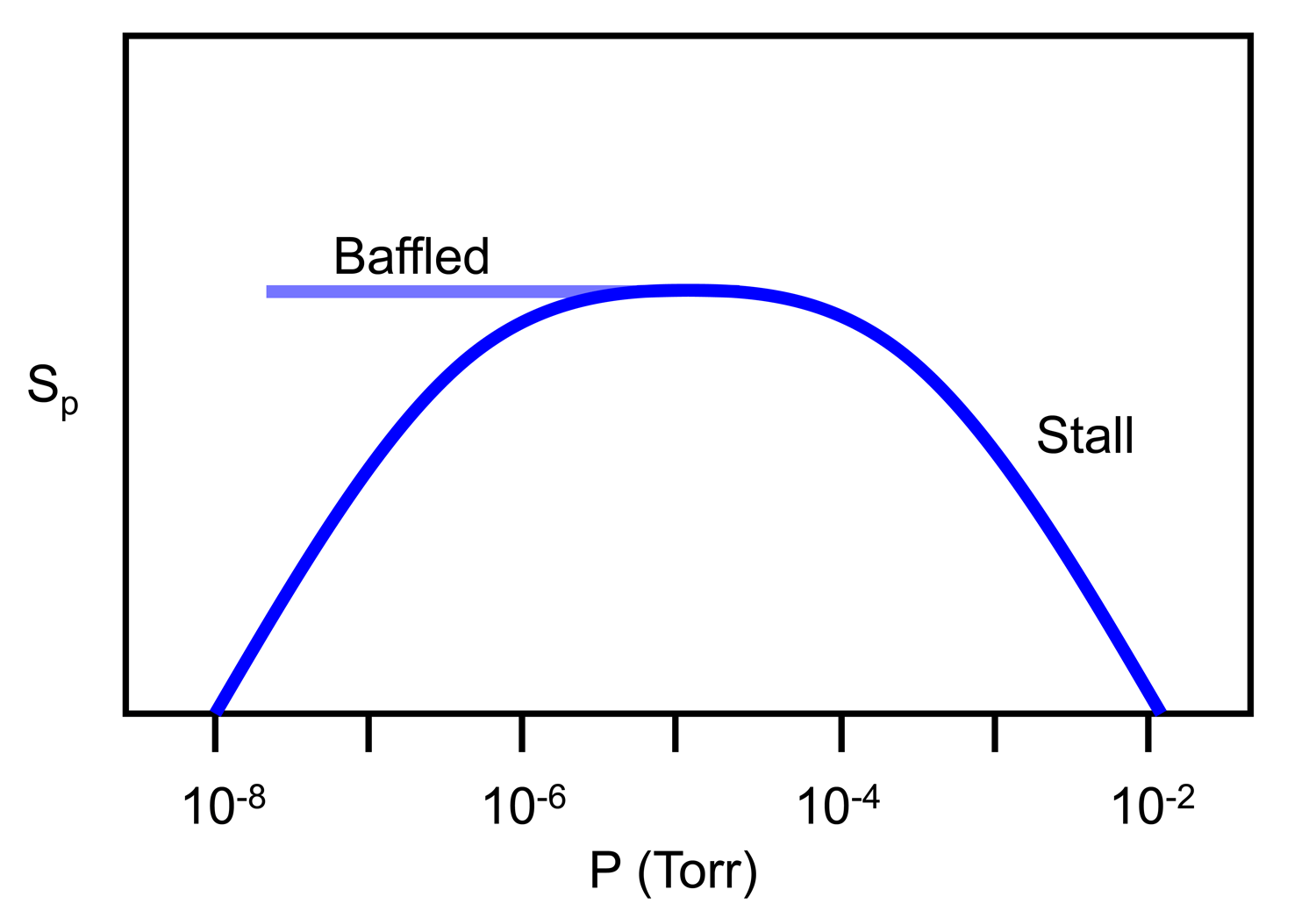
Plot of pumping speed as a function of pressure for a diffusion pump.

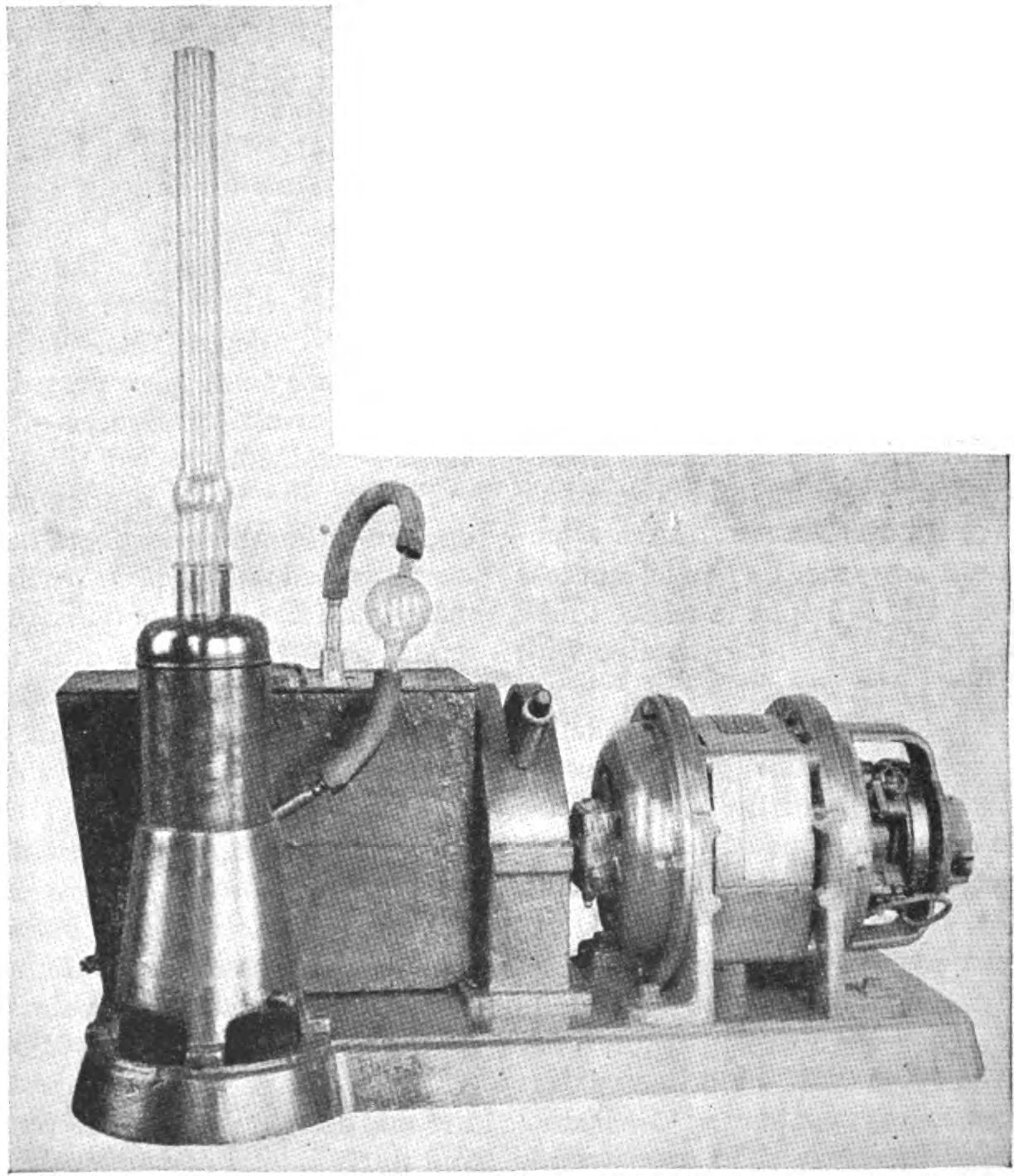
Early Langmuir mercury diffusion pump (vertical column) and its backing pump (in background), about 1920. The diffusion pump was widely used in manufacturing vacuum tubes, the key technology which dominated the radio and electronics industry for 50 years.

The steam ejector is a popular form of pump for vacuum distillation and freeze-drying. A jet of steam entrains the vapour that must be removed from the vacuum chamber. Steam ejectors can have single or multiple stages, with and without condensers in between the stages. While both steam ejectors and diffusion pumps use jets of vapor to entrain gas, they work on fundamentally different principles – steam ejectors rely on viscous flow and mixing to pump gas, whereas diffusion pumps use molecular diffusion. This has several consequences. In diffusion pumps, the inlet pressure can be much lower than the static pressure of jet, whereas in steam ejectors, the two pressures are about the same. Also, diffusion pumps are capable of much higher compression ratios, and cannot discharge directly to atmosphere.

== See also ==
- Turbomolecular pump
- Vacuum pump
- Aspirator (pump)
