= Molecular drag pump =

A molecular drag pump is a type of vacuum pump that uses the drag of air molecules against a rotating surface. The most common sub-type is the Holweck pump, which contains a rotating cylinder with spiral grooves that direct the gas from the high-vacuum side of the pump to the low-vacuum side of the pump. The older Gaede pump design is similar, but is much less common due to disadvantages in pumping speed. In general, molecular drag pumps are more efficient for heavy gases, so the lighter gases (hydrogen, deuterium, helium) will make up the majority of the residual gases left after running a molecular drag pump.

The turbomolecular pump, invented in the 1950s, is a more advanced version based on similar operation, and a Holweck pump is often used as the backing pump for it. The Holweck pump can produce a vacuum as low as 1 μPa.

== History ==
=== Gaede ===
The earliest molecular drag pump was created by Wolfgang Gaede, who had the idea of the pump in 1905, and spent several years corresponding with Leybold trying to build a practical device. The first prototype device to meet expectations was completed in 1910, achieving a pressure of less than 10^{−6} mbar. By 1912, twelve pumps had been created, and the concept was presented to the meeting of the Physical Society in Münster on 16 September of that year, and was generally well received.

Gaede published several papers on the principles of this molecular pump, and patented the design. The working principle is that the gas in the chamber is exposed to one side of a rapidly spinning cylinder. Collisions between the gas and the spinning cylinder gives the molecules of gas momentum in the same direction as the surface of the cylinder, which is designed to turn away from the vacuum chamber and toward a fore-line. A separate backing pump is used to lower the pressure at the fore-line (output of the molecular pump), since in order to function, the molecular pump needs to operate under pressures low enough that the gas inside is in free molecular flow. One important measure of the pump is the compression ratio, $K$. This is the ratio of the pressure of the vacuum, $P_{vac}$, to the pressure to the outlet, $P_{fore}$, and is roughly constant across different pressures, but depends on the individual gas:

$$\frac{P_{fore}}{P_{vac}} = K.$$

The compression ratio can be estimated using the kinetic theory of gases by calculating the flow due to collisions with the rotating surfaces and rate of diffusion in the reverse direction. The compression ratio tends to be better for heavy molecules, since the thermal velocity of lighter gases is higher and speed of the rotating cylinder has a less effect on these faster-moving gases.

This "Gaede molecular pump" was used in an early experiment testing vacuum gauges.

=== Holweck ===
The improved Holweck design was invented in the early 1920s by Fernand Holweck as part of his apparatus for his work in studying soft X-rays. It was manufactured by French scientific instrument maker Charles Beaudouin. He applied for a patent on the device in 1925. The main difference from the Gaede pump was the addition of a spiral, cut into either the spinning cylinder or the static housing. Holweck pumps have been frequently modeled theoretically. Holweck's classmate and collaborator, H. Gondet, later suggested other improvements to the design.

=== Siegbahn ===
Another design was given by Manne Siegbahn. He had produced a pump which was used in 1926. About 50 of Siegbahn's pumps were made from 1926 to 1940. These pumps were generally slower than comparable diffusion pumps, so were rare outside of Uppsala University. Larger, faster pumps of the Siegbahn type began to be made around 1940 for use in a cyclotron. In 1943, Siegbahn published a paper regarding these pumps, which were based on a rotating disk.

== Use in turbomolecular pumps ==
While the molecular drag pumps of Gaede, Holweck, and Siegbahn are functional designs, they have remained relatively uncommon as stand-alone pumps. One issue was pumping speed: alternatives such as the diffusion pump are much faster. Secondly, a major issue with these pumps is reliability: with a gap between moving parts in the tens of micrometers, any dust or temperature change threatens to bring the parts into contact and cause the pump to fail.

The turbomolecular pump overcame many of these disadvantages. Many modern turbomolecular pumps contain built-in molecular drag stages, which allows them to operate at higher foreline pressures.

As a stage in turbomolecular pumps, the most widely used design is the Holweck type, due to a significantly higher pumping speed than the Gaede design. While slower, the Gaede design has the advantage of tolerating a higher inlet pressure for the same compression ratio, and being more compact than the Holweck type. While the Gaede and Holweck designs are significantly more widely used, Siegbahn-type designs continue to be investigated, due to their significantly more compact design compared with Holweck stages.

== See also ==
- Sprengel pump
