= Willem Hendrik Keesom =

Dutch physicist (1876–1956)

Willem Keesom
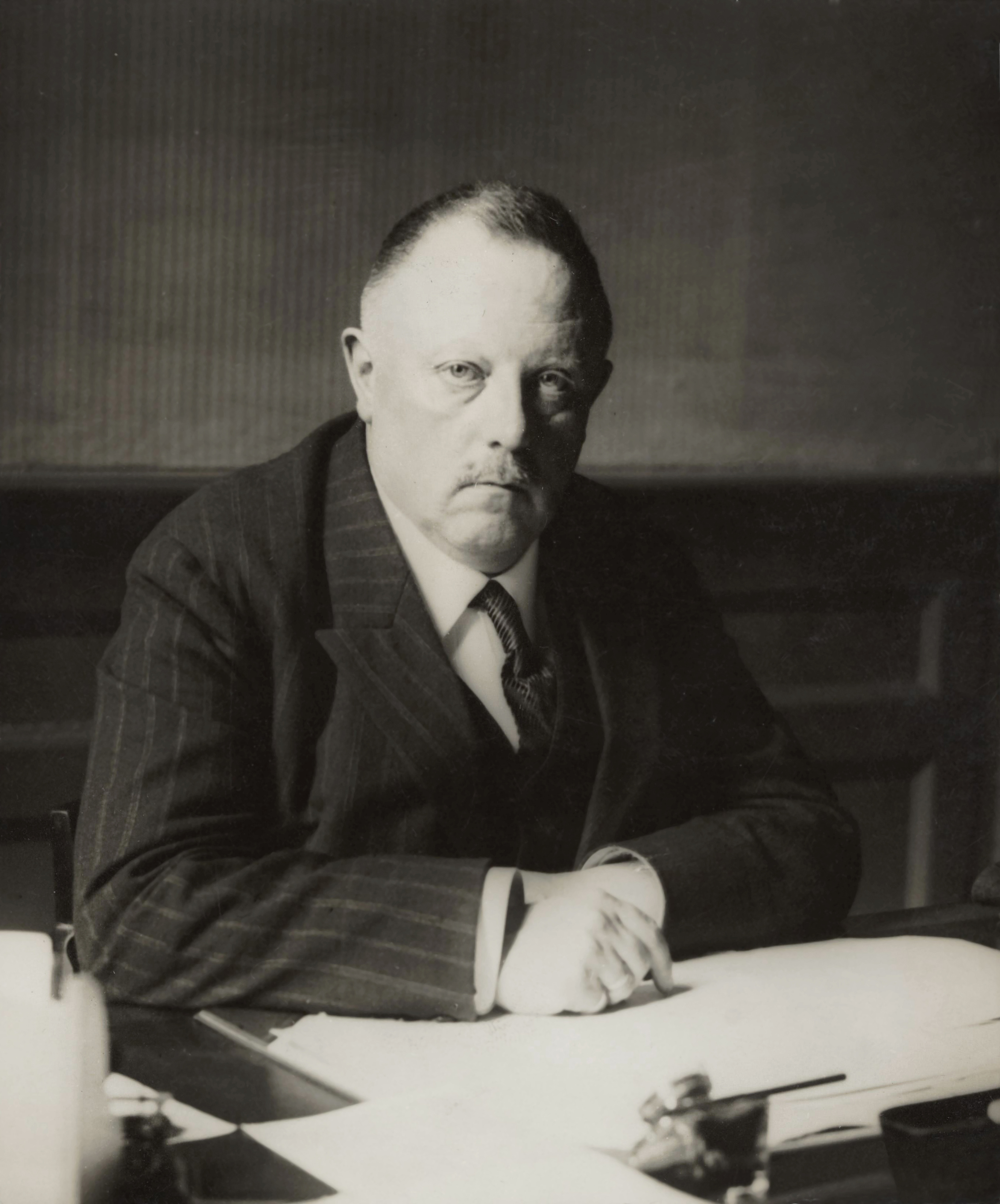
- Willem Keesom in 1926
- Born: 21 June 1876; Texel, Netherlands
- Died: 3 March 1956 (aged 79); Leiden, Netherlands
- Known for: States of liquid helium
- Scientific career
- Fields: physics
- Doctoral advisor: Johannes Diderik van der Waals

Willem Hendrik Keesom (/ˈkeɪsoʊm/) (21 June 1876, Texel – 3 March 1956, Leiden) was a Dutch physicist who, in 1926, invented a method to freeze liquid helium. He also developed the first mathematical description of dipole–dipole interactions in 1921. Thus, dipole–dipole interactions are also known as Keesom interactions. He was previously a student of Heike Kamerlingh Onnes, who had discovered superconductivity (a feat for which Kamerlingh Onnes received the 1913 Nobel Prize in Physics).

He also discovered the lambda point transition at 2.2 K with a specific-heat maximum between the two states of liquid helium-4 (states called helium I and helium II) in 1930.

He and his daughter Anna Keesom (also doctor in physics), discovered the unusual thermal conductivity of liquid helium in 1936.

In 1924 he became member of the Royal Netherlands Academy of Arts and Sciences. In 1966, the minor planet 9686 Keesom was named after him.

== See also ==
- Timeline of low-temperature technology
