= Turbomolecular pump =

Pump designed to create and maintain high vacuum

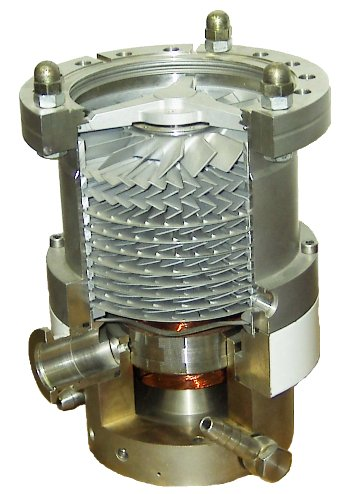
Interior view of a turbomolecular pump

A turbomolecular pump is a type of vacuum pump, superficially similar to a turbopump, used to obtain and maintain high vacuum. These pumps work on the principle that gas molecules can be given momentum in a desired direction by repeated collision with a moving solid surface. In a turbomolecular pump, a rapidly spinning fan rotor hits gas molecules from the inlet of the pump towards the exhaust in order to create or maintain a vacuum.

== History ==
The turbomolecular pump was invented in 1958 by W. Becker, based on the older molecular drag pumps developed by Wolfgang Gaede in 1913, Fernand Holweck in 1923, and Manne Siegbahn in 1944.

== Operating principles ==
Most turbomolecular pumps employ multiple stages, each consisting of a quickly rotating rotor blade paired with a stationary stator blade. The system is an axial compressor that puts energy into the gas, rather than a turbine, which takes energy out of a moving fluid to create rotary power; thus, "turbomolecular pump" is a misnomer. Gas captured by the upper stages is pushed into the lower stages and successively compressed to the level of the fore-vacuum (backing pump) pressure. As the gas molecules enter through the inlet, the rotor, which has a number of angled blades, hits the molecules. Thus the mechanical energy of the blades is transferred to the gas molecules. With this newly acquired momentum, the gas molecules enter into the gas transfer holes in the stator. This leads them to the next stage, where they again collide with the rotor surface, and this process is continued, finally leading them outwards through the exhaust.

Because of the relative motion of rotor and stator, molecules preferentially hit the lower sides of the blades. Because the blade surfaces look down, most of the scattered molecules will leave them downwards. The surfaces are rough, so no reflection will occur. A blade needs to be thick and stable enough for high-pressure operation and as thin as possible and slightly bent for maximum compression. For high compression ratios, the throat between adjacent rotor blades (as shown in the image) is pointing as much as possible in the forward direction. For high flow rates, the blades are at 45° and reach close to the axis.

Schematic of a turbomolecular pump.

Because the compression of each stage is ≈10, each stage closer to the outlet is considerably smaller than the preceding inlet stages. This has two consequences. The geometric progression implies that infinitely many stages could ideally fit into a finite axial length. The finite length in this case is the full height of the housing, as the bearings, the motor, and controller and some of the coolers can be installed inside on the axis. Radially, to grasp as much of the thin gas at the entrance, the inlet-side rotors would ideally have a larger radius, and correspondingly higher centrifugal force; ideal blades would get thinner towards their tips. However, because the average speed of a blade affects pumping so much, this is done by increasing the root diameter rather than the tip diameter where practical.

Turbomolecular pumps must operate at very high speeds, and the resulting heat buildup due to friction imposes design limitations. Some turbomolecular pumps use magnetic bearings to reduce friction and oil contamination. Because the magnetic bearings and the temperature cycles allow for only a limited clearance between rotor and stator, the blades at the high-pressure stages are somewhat degenerated into a single helical foil each. Laminar flow cannot be used for pumping, because laminar turbines stall when not used at the designed flow. The pump can be cooled to improve compression, but should not be so cold as to condense ice on the blades. When a turbopump is stopped, the oil from the backing vacuum may backstream through the turbopump and contaminate the chamber. One way to prevent this is to introduce a laminar flow of nitrogen through the pump. The transition from vacuum to nitrogen and from a running to a still turbopump has to be synchronized precisely to avoid mechanical stress to the pump and overpressure at the exhaust. A thin membrane and a valve at the exhaust should be added to protect the turbopump from excessive back pressure (e.g. after a power failure or leaks in the backing vacuum).

The rotor is stabilized in all of its six degrees of freedom. One degree is governed by the electric motor. Minimally, this degree must be stabilized electronically (or by a diamagnetic material, which is too unstable to be used in a precision pump bearing). Another way (ignoring losses in magnetic cores at high frequencies) is to construct this bearing as an axis with a sphere at each end. These spheres are inside hollow static spheres. On the surface of each sphere is a checkerboard pattern of inwards- and outwards-going magnetic field lines. As the checkerboard pattern of the static spheres is rotated, the rotor rotates. In this construction, no axis is made stable on the cost of making another axis unstable, but all axes are neutral and the electronic regulation is less stressed and will be more dynamically stable. Hall-effect sensors can be used to sense the rotational position, and the other degrees of freedom can be measured capacitively.

== Maximum pressure ==
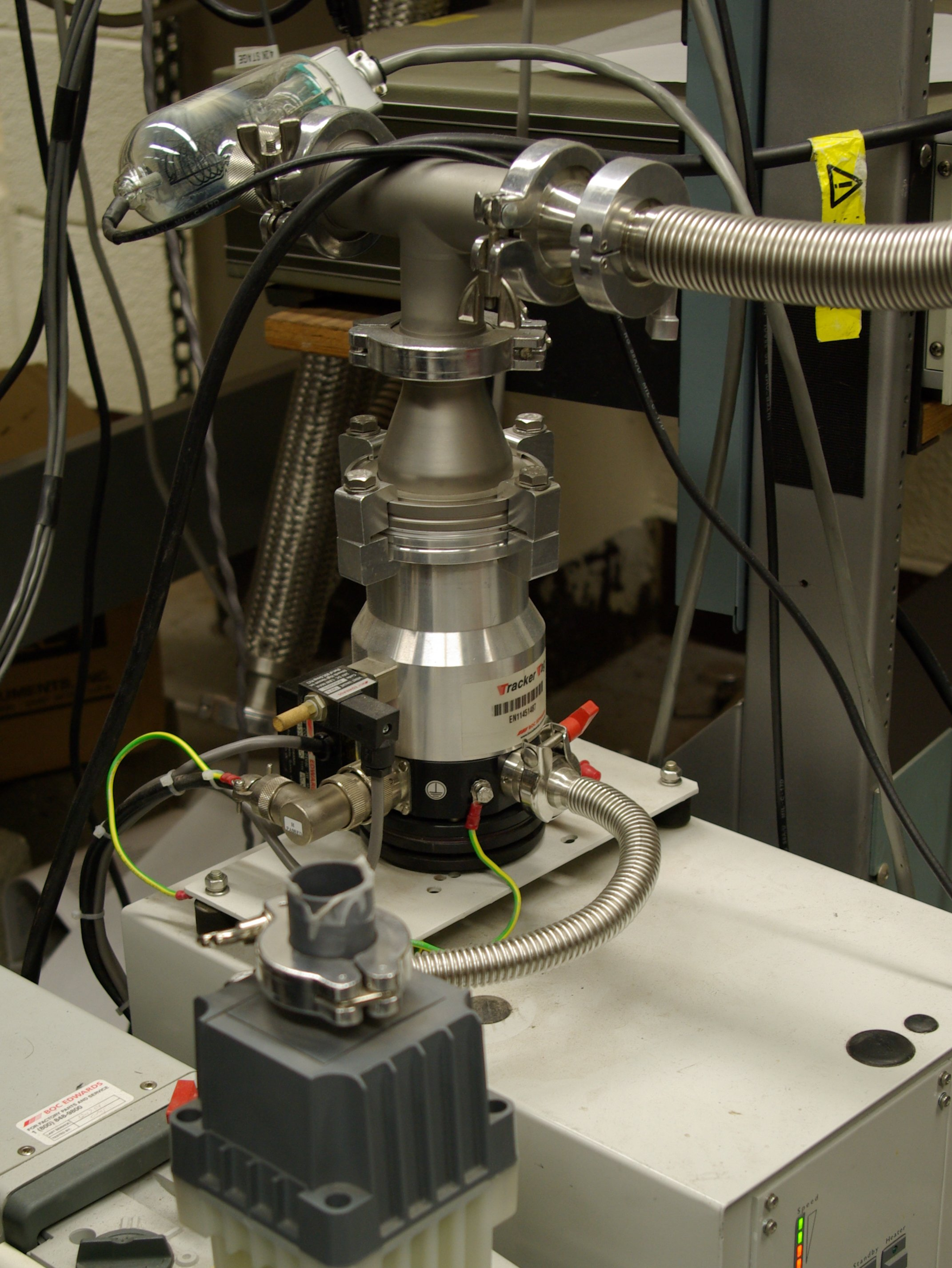
A turbomolecular pump with attached vacuum ionization gauge for pressure measurement.

At atmospheric pressure, the mean free path of air is about 70 nm. A turbomolecular pump can work only if those molecules hit by the moving blades reach the stationary blades before colliding with other molecules on their way. To achieve that, the gap between moving blades and stationary blades must be close to or less than the mean free path. From a practical construction standpoint, a feasible gap between the blade sets is on the order of 1 mm, so a turbopump will stall (no net pumping) if exhausted directly to the atmosphere. Since the mean free path is inversely proportional to pressure, a turbopump will pump when the exhaust pressure is less than about 10 Pa (0.10 mbar), where the mean free path is about 0.7 mm.

Most turbopumps have a Holweck pump (or molecular drag pump) as their last stage to increase the maximum backing pressure (exhaust pressure) to about 1–10 mbar. Theoretically, a centrifugal pump, a side channel pump, or a regenerative pump could be used to back to atmospheric pressure directly, but currently there is no commercially available turbopump that exhausts directly to atmosphere. In most cases, the exhaust is connected to a mechanical backing pump (usually called roughing pump) that produces a pressure low enough for the turbomolecular pump to work efficiently. Typically, this backing pressure is below 0.1 mbar and commonly about 0.01 mbar. The backing pressure is rarely below 10^{−3} mbar (mean free path ≈ 70 mm) because the flow resistance of the vacuum pipe between the turbopump and the roughing pump becomes significant.

The turbomolecular pump can be a very versatile pump. It can generate many degrees of vacuum from intermediate vacuum (≈10^{−2} Pa) up to ultra-high vacuum levels (≈10^{−8} Pa).

Multiple turbomolecular pumps in a lab or manufacturing plant can be connected by tubes to a small backing pump. Automatic valves and diffusion-pump-like injection into a large buffer-tube in front of the backing pump prevents any overpressure from one pump from stalling another pump.

== Practical considerations ==
Laws of fluid dynamics do not provide good approximations for the behavior of individual, highly separated, non-interacting gas molecules, like those found in high-vacuum environments. The maximum compression varies linearly with circumferential rotor speed. In order to obtain extremely low pressures, down to 10^{−6} Pa, rotation rates of 20,000 to 90,000 revolutions per minute are often necessary. Unfortunately, the compression ratio varies exponentially with the square root of the molecular weight of the gas. Thus, heavy molecules are pumped much more efficiently than light molecules. Most gases are heavy enough to be well-pumped, but it is difficult to pump hydrogen and helium efficiently.

An additional drawback stems from the high rotor speed of this type of pump: very high-grade bearings are required, which increases the cost.

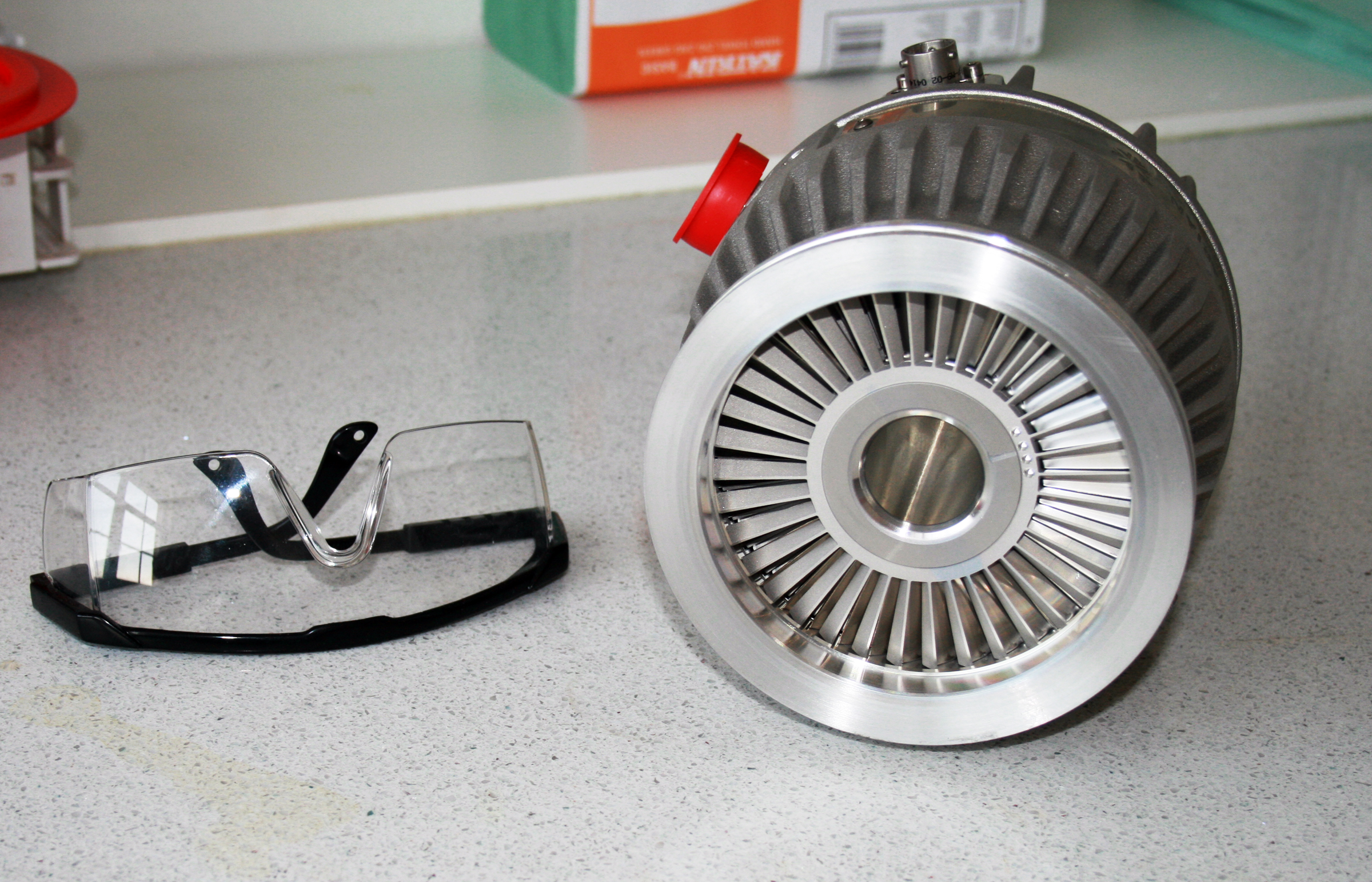
The turbomolecular pump from ICP-MS instrument Varia.

Because turbomolecular pumps only work in molecular flow conditions, a pure turbomolecular pump will require a very large backing pump to work effectively. Thus, many modern pumps have a molecular drag stage such as a Holweck or Gaede mechanism near the exhaust to reduce the size of backing pump required.

Much of recent turbomolecular pump development has been focused on improvement of the effectiveness of the drag stages. As gas is removed from a pumped space, the lighter gases hydrogen and helium become a larger proportion of the remaining gas load. In recent years, it has been demonstrated that the precise design of the surface geometry of the drag stages can have a marked effect on the pumping of these light gases, improving compression ratios by up to two orders of magnitude for a given pumping volume. As a result, it is possible to use much smaller backing pumps than would be required by pure turbomolecular pumps or designing more compact turbomolecular pumps.

== See also ==
- Roots blower
