= Kleemenko cycle =

Technique to cool gases

The Kleemenko cycle or one-flow cascade cycle is a single-stream mixed-refrigerant technique used to cool or liquefy gases. The term "Kleemenko cycle" is used in refrigeration if multi-component refrigerants (MCR) are used in a cycle.

The Russian scientist Aleksandr Petrovich Klimenko (Александр Петрович Клименко) described the one-flow cascade cycle in the Proceedings of XIII International Conference of Refrigeration in Copenhagen, Denmark, in 1959. It was published in "Progress in Refrigeration Science and Technology", Volume, I Pergamon Press, 1960, pp. 34–39.

== See also ==
- Hampson–Linde cycle
- Timeline of low-temperature technology
