= Wolfgang Gaede =

German physicist

- Born: 25 May 1878; Bremerhaven, Bremen, Germany
- Died: 24 June 1945 (aged 67); Munich, Bavaria, Germany
- Known for: Diffusion pump Momentum transfer pump Gaede molecular pump
- Awards: Werner von Siemens Ring (1933); Duddell Medal and Prize (1932); Elliott Cresson Medal (1909)
- Scientific career
- Fields: Vacuum engineering
- Workplaces: University of Freiburg, Karlsruhe Institute of Technology

Wolfgang Max Paul Gaede (25 May 1878 – 24 June 1945) was a German physicist and pioneer of vacuum engineering.

== Life ==
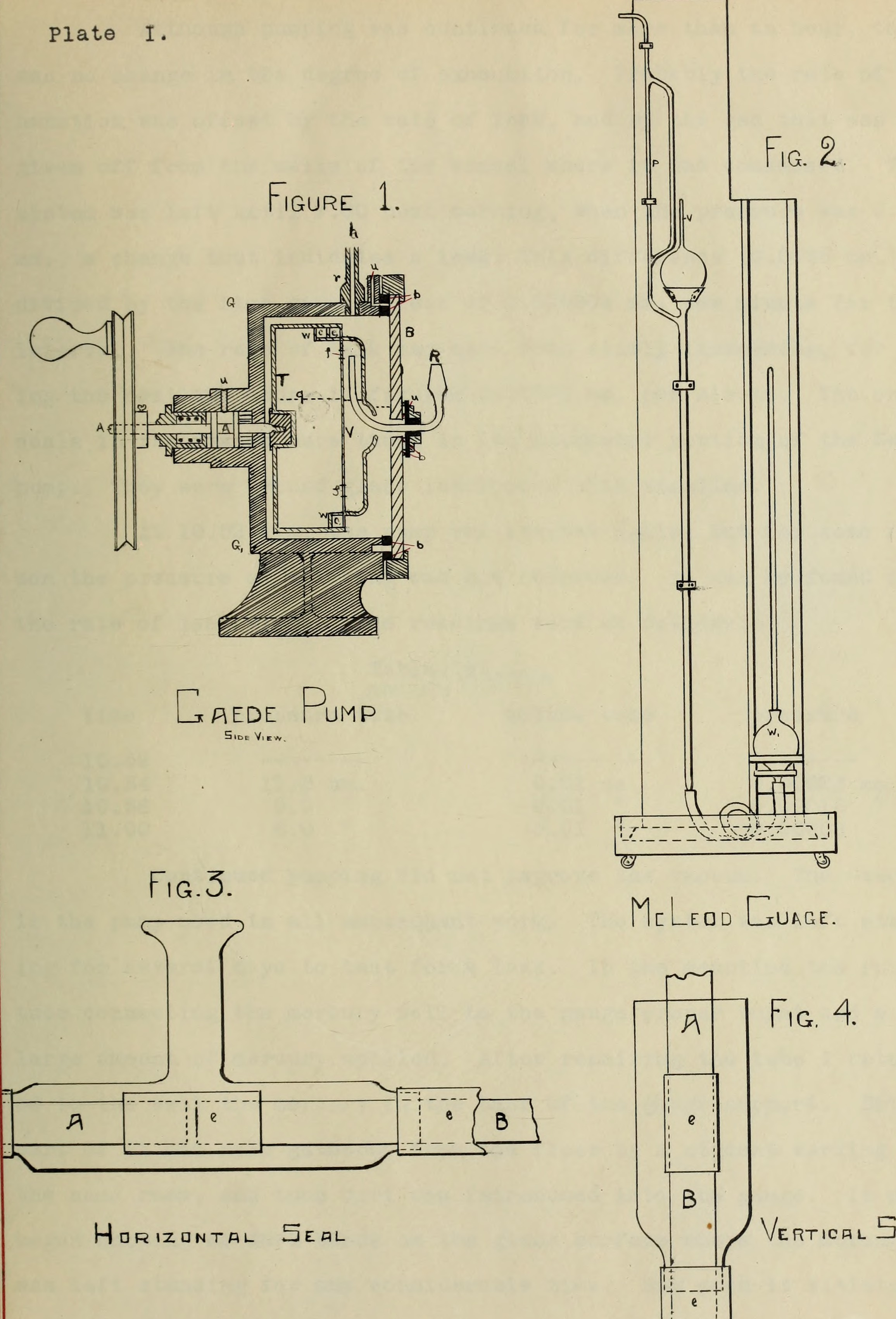
Diagram of a Gaede pump

Gaede was born in Lehe, Bremerhaven, the son of Prussian Colonel Karl Gaede and Amalia, nee Renf. In 1897 he began studying medicine at the University of Freiburg, but he soon switched to the field of physics. In 1901 he wrote his doctoral thesis on changing the specific heat of metals with temperature. Subsequent research on the Volta effect in a vacuum was unsuccessful, as the pump technology could not create a sufficient vacuum for the investigations. This prompted Gaede to deal more closely with vacuum technology. He invented the rotating mercury pump for high vacuum, which he presented to his scientific colleagues in 1905 at a congress in Merano. Also in Freiburg im Breisgau, Gaede wrote his habilitation thesis on The external friction of gases in 1909.

In 1913 he received a professorship at the University of Freiburg. In the following six years, he invented the momentum transfer pump (molecular pump) and a mercury diffusion pump. In 1919, Gaede joined the Karlsruhe Institute of Technology as a professor of experimental physics, where he worked in the following research areas:

- Vacuum technology
- Radio and communications technology
- Process for obtaining pure hydrogen and mercury
- Exploration of lightning protection equipment
- Movement of liquids in a rotating hollow ring

In 1930, Gaede was elected an Academy of Sciences Leopoldina member. In 1933/34 two employees denounced Gaede to the Gestapo, as having called the National Socialists "childish". He then had to retire, although all allegations proved to be false. Despite this incident, the Werner von Siemens Ring for 1933 was given to him in 1934. He also received various awards at the international level in the following years.

A lifelong consultancy contract from 1906 with Leybold GmbH of Cologne allowed him to continue his research in his private laboratory in Karlsruhe and later in Munich. Among other things, he invented the gas ballast principle. Gaede owned almost 40 patents in Germany, and many others abroad. A call to return to the university in Karlsruhe after the end of the war did not reach Gaede.

Gaede died in Munich in 1945.

== Honours and memorials ==
- Elliott Cresson Medal, Franklin Institute, Philadelphia, 1909
- Duddell Medal and Prize, Physical Society of London, 1932
- A lecture hall of the Karlsruhe University, named in 1969
- Wolfgang-Gaede-Strasse, on the university grounds in Karlsruhe, named in 1993
- Gaedestraße in Cologne, beside Oerlikon Leybold Vacuum GmbH

The GAEDE Foundation, administered by the German Vacuum Society (DVG), grants young scientists the Gaede Award for work in the field of vacuum-assisted sciences. It maintains the Gaede archive at the Leybold GmbH headquarters in Cologne.
