= Isoteniscope =

Device for measuring vapor pressure

An Isoteniscope is a measuring device used to measure the vapor pressure of liquids. It consists of a submerged manometer and container holding the substance whose vapor pressure is being measured. The open end of the manometer is then connected to a pressure measuring device. A vacuum pump is used to adjust the pressure of the system and purify the sample.

Various ASTM vapor pressure measurement standards use the isoteniscope. Dr. Bertrand of the Missouri University of Science and Technology offers an interactive animation of a lab procedure using the isoteniscope on his web page.
