= Leybold GmbH =

German vacuum pump manufacturer

Coordinates: 50.899679°N 6.963603°E

- Native name: Leybold GmbH
- Company type: Limited
- Industry: engine building, vacuum technology
- Headquarters: Cologne, Germany
- Key people: René Rose Stueber
- Products: product overview
- Revenue: 350 Mio CHF
- Parent: Atlas Copco
- Website: www.leybold.com

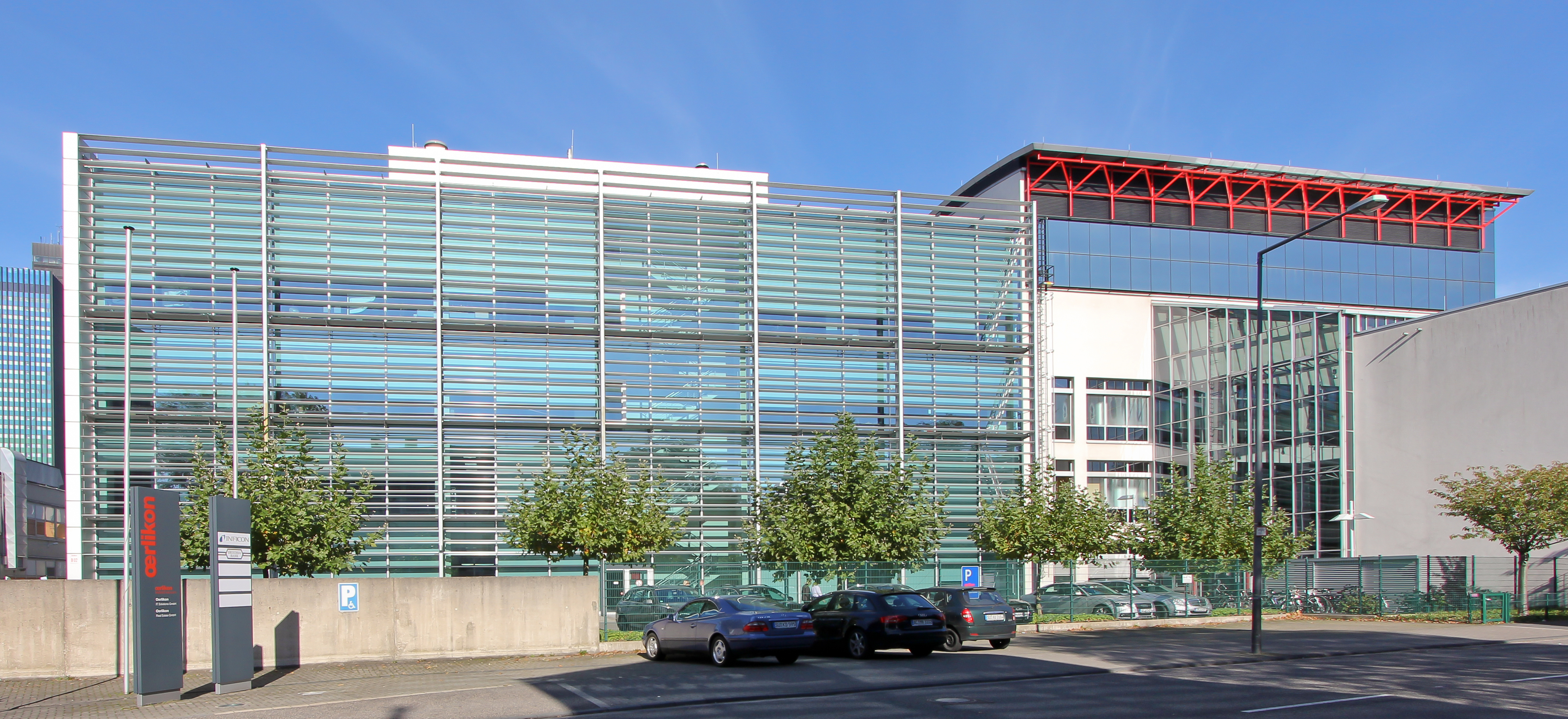
Main offices in Köln

Leybold GmbH, based in Cologne, is part of the Swedish industry group Atlas Copco. The company's core competencies are based on the development of components and systems for the generation of vacuum and gas management engineering.

== History ==
In 1850, the merchant Martin Kothe founded the trading company Kothe, but died a year later. With the introduction of the manager Ernst Leybold in 1851, the company Leybold & Kothe was formed, focusing on the distribution of pharmaceutical and physical-technical equipment and apparatus. In 1863, Ernst Leybold took over the company completely, but resold it in 1870. The company name lived on for some time, however, as E. Leybold's Nachfolger (E. Leybold's Successor).

The company divested the pharmaceutical sector to focus on propaedeutic and teaching materials, initiating the serial production of vacuum pumps as of 1906. The collaboration with Wolfgang Gaede resulted in the development of the molecular pump (1911), the mercury diffusion pump (1913), and the invention of the gas ballast design, which allows vapors to be pumped with rotary vacuum pumps (1935).

The company was reformed as a public limited company in 1922, and was converted into a limited partnership in 1936. In 1948 and 1955 respectively, the Metallgesellschaft AG and Degussa placed their first investments in E. Leybold's Nachfolger.

1967 saw the merger of E. Leybold's Nachfolger with Heraeus Hochvakuum GmbH. The Degussa AG, the Metallgesellschaft AG and the W.C. Heraeus GmbH were equal shareholders in the newly created Leybold Heraeus GmbH.

After Metallgesellschaft and W.C. Heraeus sold their shares in 1987, Leybold Heraeus GmbH became Leybold AG and its headquarters were moved from Cologne to Hanau.

In 1994, Degussa sold Leybold to the Swiss Oerlikon Bührle Group, which combined Leybold with the Balzers AG, which was already in their possession, to form the Balzers and Leybold Group. The merger of these companies resulted in the world's largest vacuum and surface technology company with around 6 500 employees, generating sales of DEM 1.8 billion in 1995.

In 2000, Degussa sold the remaining propaedeutic and teaching materials division, which today – after bankruptcy in 2008 – operates under the company name LD Didactic and has its headquarters near Cologne.

In 2006, Leybold Vacuum GmbH was renamed to Oerlikon Leybold Vacuum as part of a group-wide renaming of all Group Segments.

In 2015 Oerlikon announced the sale of the vacuum business to Swedish company Atlas Copco. The sale was finalized in September 2016. Then, the company was renamed to Leybold GmbH and became part of the Vacuum Solutions division of the Compressors business area of Atlas Copco.

== Literature ==
- Vakuum Pumpen (Gastransfervakuumpumpen), W. H. Faragallah (Hrsg.), Verlag und Bildarchiv W. H. Faragallah, ISBN 978-3-929682-28-1.
- Theory and Practice of Vacuum Technology, Wutz/Adam/Walcher, Verlag Vieweg, ISBN 3-528-08908-3.
- Wilhelm Burgmann/Uwe Zoelligː Explosionsschutz für Stahlentgasung, Verlag Stahl & Eisen, 15.12.2014.
- Fliessatzː Explosionsschutz für Stahlentkohlungs-Vakuumanlagen - Stahlentkohlung und Explosionsschutz
- Oerlikon Leybold Vakuum 19989 Grundlagen der Vakuumtechnik
- Oerlikon Leybold Vakuum 19990 Fundamentals of Vacuum Technology
- Oerlikon Leybold Vakuum Grundlagen der Lecksuchtechnik - Basic Principles on Leak Detection Techniques
