= Ellen Marx (artist) =

French-German visual artist and author

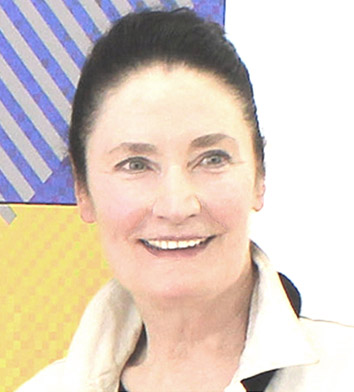
Ellen Marx in 2013

Ellen Marx (22 February 1939 – 5 May 2023) was a French-German visual artist and author of reference books about color.

== Biography ==
Marx was born in Saarbrücken, Germany, where she studied visual research and graphic design from 1957 to 1962 at the Staatliche Werkkunstschule, Saarbrücken notably with professor Oskar Holweck, an artist belonging to the ZERO group in Germany (Günther Uecker, Otto Piene, Heinz Mack). His work and his teaching would have a profound influence on her own work. In 1962 Ellen Marx went to Paris and two years later established an atelier 40 km from Paris where she lived and worked until her death. After the research work of E.Chevreul, Johannes Itten and Josef Albers, Marx has quantified objectively, for the first time, color relativity in her book Optical Color and Simultaneity. In parallel to the publication of the book in 1983, a solo exhibition took place at the Centre Georges Pompidou in Paris. The color reliefs in this exhibition were interactive and changed constantly with the view point of the spectator. Numerous other group and solo exhibitions were held in Europe, notably Relief Concrete in Germany today with the German artists of Concrete Art in the Modern Gallery of the Museum of the Saar, Germany in 1981. In 1989 Marx's French editor Pierre Zech published in the collection "Le Temps Apprivoisé" her book "Méditer la couleur" which examines in great detail the phenomenon of successive contrast.

Marx was invited to be the Keynote Address Speaker of the International Conference on Color Education which was organized by the University of Art and Design in Helsinki and which showed in parallel her work in an exhibition alongside paintings by Josef Albers. Since 2000 she has been conceiving her paintings with the computer.

Ellen Marx died on 5 May 2023 in Jumeauville, France.

== Bibliography ==
- Ellen Marx: Les contrastes de la couleur Dessain et Tolra, Paris 1973, ISBN 2-249-25010-3
  - English translation The contrast of colors New York, Van Nostrand Reinhold 1973, ISBN 9780442251147 According to WorldCat, the book is held in 290 libraries
  - German translation, Die Farbkontraste : Eine anschauliche Einführung in die Gesetzmässigkeiten der Farbe. ISBN 9783473615537
  - Dutch translation De kleurkontrasten ISBN 9789021300542
  - Japanese translation 色彩の対比 / Shikisai no taih OCLC 703800883
- Ellen Marx: Couleur Optique Dessain et Tolra, Paris 1983 – ISBN 2-249-25026-X
  - German translation Farbintegration und Simultankontrast Muster Schmidt Verlag, Zürich, Göttingen 1989 ISBN 3-7881-4045-3
- Ellen Marx: Optical Color and Simultaneity, Van Nostrand Reinhold, New-York, ISBN 0-442-23864-9 According to WorldCat, the book is held in 347 libraries
- Ellen Marx Méditer La Couleur. Paris: P. Zech, 1989 ISBN 9782283580967
