= Cryopump =

Type of vacuum pump

A cryopump or a "cryogenic pump" is a vacuum pump that traps gases and vapours by condensing them on a cold surface, but are only effective on some gases. The effectiveness depends on the freezing and boiling points of the gas relative to the cryopump's temperature. They are sometimes used to block particular contaminants, for example in front of a diffusion pump to trap backstreaming oil, or in front of a McLeod gauge to keep out water. In this function, they are called a cryotrap, waterpump or cold trap, even though the physical mechanism is the same as for a cryopump.

Cryotrapping can also refer to a somewhat different effect, where molecules will increase their residence time on a cold surface without actually freezing (supercooling). There is a delay between the molecule impinging on the surface and rebounding from it. Kinetic energy will have been lost as the molecules slow down. For example, hydrogen does not condense at 8 kelvins, but it can be cryotrapped. This effectively traps molecules for an extended period and thereby removes them from the vacuum environment just like cryopumping.

== History ==
Early experiments into cryotrapping of gasses in activated charcoal were conducted as far back as 1874.

The first cryopumps mainly used liquid helium to cool the pump, either in a large liquid helium reservoir, or by continuous flow into the cryopump. However, over time most cryopumps were redesigned to use gaseous helium, enabled by the invention of better cryocoolers. The key refrigeration technology was discovered in the 1950s by two employees of the Massachusetts-based company Arthur D. Little Inc., William E. Gifford and Howard O. McMahon. This technology came to be known as the Gifford-McMahon cryocooler. In the 1970s, the Gifford-McMahon cryocooler was used to make a vacuum pump by Helix Technology Corporation and its subsidiary company Cryogenic Technology Inc. In 1976, cryopumps began to be used in IBM's manufacturing of integrated circuits. The use of cryopumps became common in semiconductor manufacturing worldwide, with expansions such as a cryogenics company founded jointly by Helix and ULVAC (jp:アルバック) in 1981.

== Operation ==
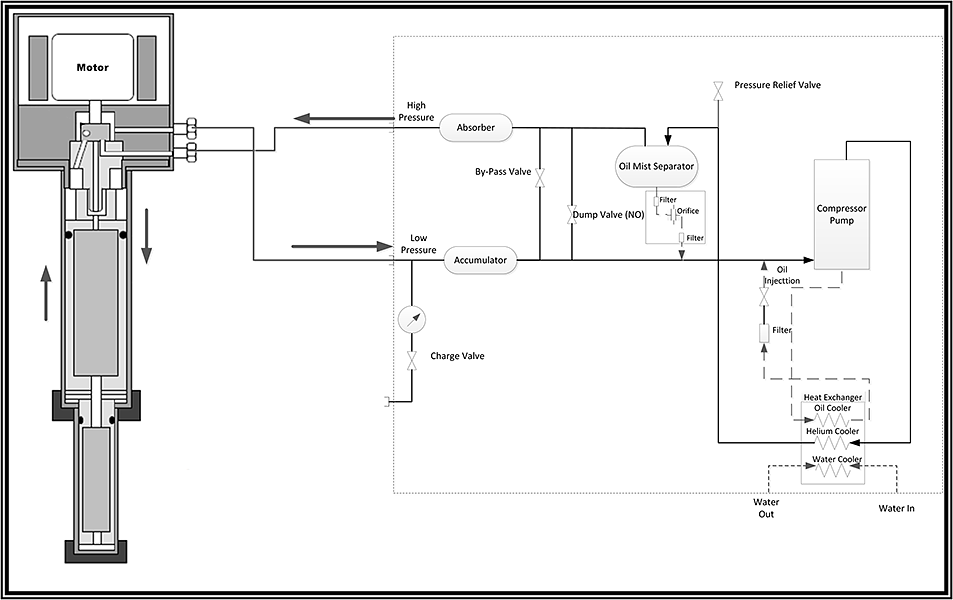
Diagram of a cryopump

Cryopumps are commonly cooled by compressed helium, though they may also use dry ice, liquid nitrogen, or stand-alone versions may include a built-in cryocooler. Baffles are often attached to the cold head to expand the surface area available for condensation, but these also increase the radiative heat uptake of the cryopump. Over time, the surface eventually saturates with condensate and thus the pumping speed gradually drops to zero. It will hold the trapped gases as long as it remains cold, but it will not condense fresh gases from leaks or backstreaming until it is regenerated. Saturation happens very quickly in low vacuums, so cryopumps are usually only used in high or ultrahigh vacuum systems.

The cryopump provides fast, clean pumping of all gases in the 10^{−3} to 10^{−9} Torr range. The cryopump operates on the principle that gases can be condensed and held at extremely low vapor pressures, achieving high speeds and throughputs. The cold head consists of a two-stage cold head cylinder (part of the vacuum vessel) and a drive unit displacer assembly. These together produce closed-cycle refrigeration at temperatures that range from 60 to 80K for the first-stage cold station to 10 to 20K for the second-stage cold station, typically.

Some cryopumps have multiple stages at various low temperatures, with the outer stages shielding the coldest inner stages. The outer stages condense high boiling point gases such as water and oil, thus saving the surface area and refrigeration capacity of the inner stages for lower boiling point gases such as nitrogen.

As cooling temperatures decrease when using dry ice, liquid nitrogen, then compressed helium, lower molecular-weight gases can be trapped. Trapping nitrogen, helium, and hydrogen requires extremely low temperatures (~10K) and large surface area as described below. Even at this temperature, the lighter gases helium and hydrogen have very low trapping efficiency and are the predominant molecules in ultra-high vacuum systems.

Cryopumps are often combined with sorption pumps by coating the cold head with highly adsorbing materials such as activated charcoal or a zeolite. As the sorbent saturates, the effectiveness of a sorption pump decreases, but can be recharged by heating the zeolite material (preferably under conditions of low pressure) to outgas it. The breakdown temperature of the zeolite material's porous structure may limit the maximum temperature that it may be heated to for regeneration.

Sorption pumps are a type of cryopump that is often used as roughing pumps to reduce pressures from the range of atmospheric to on the order of 0.1 Pa (10^{−3} Torr), while lower pressures are achieved using a finishing pump (see vacuum).

=== Regeneration ===
Regeneration of a cryopump is the process of evaporating the trapped gases. During a regeneration cycle, the cryopump is warmed to room temperature or higher, allowing trapped gases to change from a solid state to a gaseous state and thereby be released from the cryopump through a pressure relief valve into the atmosphere.

Most production equipment utilizing a cryopump have a means to isolate the cryopump from the vacuum chamber so regeneration takes place without exposing the vacuum system to released gasses such as water vapor. Water vapor is the hardest natural element to remove from vacuum chamber walls upon exposure to the atmosphere due to monolayer formation and hydrogen bonding. Adding heat to the dry nitrogen purge-gas will speed the warm-up and reduce the regeneration time.

When regeneration is complete, the cryopump will be roughed to 50μm (50 milliTorr or μmHg), isolated, and the rate-of-rise (ROR) will be monitored to test for complete regeneration. If the ROR exceeds 10μm/min the cryopump will require additional purge time.
