= Sprengel pump =

Type of vacuum pump

A pump of this type is capable of producing high vacuum in which the pressure is 1 mPa.

The Sprengel pump is a vacuum pump that uses drops of mercury falling through a small-bore capillary tube to trap air from the system to be evacuated. (Note: As Sprengel himself explained, his vacuum pump was a modification of the "trompe" (or "trombe"), which had been known in Europe at least since the sixteenth century. In a trompe, water falls from a reservoir through a pipe. The pipe's upper end is closed except for a set of small-diameter tubes, each of which is open to the air at one end and which dips under the water at its other end. As the water falls, it entrains air from the tubes. The water carries the air to the bottom of the pipe, where the air collects in a reservoir at high pressure. The trompe was used to produce a constant stream of air for smelting and metal working, among other uses. Sprengel merely connected a tube to the pipe's upper end in order to use the flow of liquid to evacuate a vessel. See Basic principle of a trompe.) It was invented by Hanover-born chemist Hermann Sprengel in 1865 while he was working in London. The pump created the highest vacuum achievable at that time, less than 1 mPa (approximately 1×10^{−8} atm).

== Operation ==
The supply of mercury is contained in the reservoir on the left. It flows over into the bulb B, where it forms drops which fall into the long tube on the right. These drops entrap between them the air in B. The mercury which runs out is collected and poured back into reservoir on the left. In this manner practically all the air can be removed from the bulb B, and hence from any vessel R, which may be connected with B. At M is a manometer which indicates the pressure in the vessel R, which is being exhausted.

Falling mercury drops compress the air to atmospheric pressure, and it is released when the stream reaches the bottom of the tube. As the pressure drops, the cushioning effect of trapped air between the droplets diminishes, so a hammering or knocking sound can be heard, accompanied by flashes of light within the evacuated vessel due to electrostatic effects on the mercury.

The speed, simplicity and efficiency of the Sprengel pump made it a popular device with experimenters. Sprengel's earliest model could evacuate a half-litre vessel in 20 minutes.

== Applications ==
William Crookes used the pumps in series in his studies of electric discharges. William Ramsay used them to isolate the noble gases, and Joseph Swan and Thomas Edison used them to evacuate their new carbon-filament incandescent light bulbs. The Sprengel pump was the key tool which made it possible, in 1879, to sufficiently exhaust the air from a light bulb so a carbon-filament light bulb lasted long enough to be commercially practical. Sprengel himself moved on to investigating explosives and was eventually elected as a Fellow of the Royal Society.
