= Fernand Holweck =

French physicist and resistant

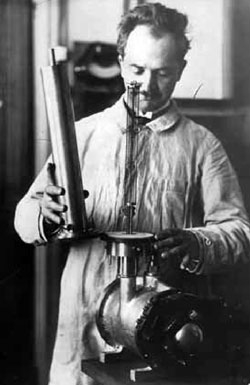
- Born: 21 July 1890; Paris, France
- Died: 24 December 1941 (aged 51); Paris, France
- Education: ESPCI ParisTech
- Known for: Holweck pump, gravimetric pendulum, work on soft X-rays, X-ray tubes and television.
- Awards: 1936 Albert 1st of Monaco Prize
- Scientific career
- Fields: Physics
- Workplaces: ESPCI ParisTech; Faculté des sciences de Paris

Fernand Holweck (21 July 1890 – 24 December 1941) was a French physicist who made important contributions in the fields of vacuum technology, electromagnetic radiation and gravitation. He is also remembered for his personal sacrifice in the cause of the French Resistance and his aid to Allied airmen in World War II.

== Biography ==
Holweck was born on 21 July 1890 to a family from the Alsace Region who had opted to remain French at the end of the Franco-Prussian War in 1870. He studied at the École supérieure de physique et de chimie industrielles de la ville de Paris (ESPCI), where he graduated top of his class in engineering physics and became personal assistant to Marie Curie. During his military service he worked under the wireless telegraphy pioneer Gustave-Auguste Ferrié at the Eiffel Tower radio station, and by 1914 he had produced his first patent, relating to thermionic tubes.

During World War I, 1914–1918, he served first at the front, working on methods to detect enemy radio signals, and later at the naval study centre in Toulon, working under Paul Langevin on ultrasonic sounding. Demobilised in 1919, Holweck resumed his work at Institut du Radium, gaining his doctorate in 1922, and eventually becoming Director of Research at the CNRS (the French National Centre for Scientific Research) in 1938.

== Science ==
In his doctoral thesis, Holweck described a seminal study of soft X-rays, that part of the spectrum of electromagnetic radiation which lies in between X-rays and the far ultraviolet. To facilitate his experimental studies, he invented a new type of vacuum pump, which later became known as the Holweck pump. This pump, which utilised the drag of air molecules against a rotating surface, achieved vacuums as great as one millionth of a centimetre of mercury, was subsequently manufactured by the notable French scientific instrument maker, Charles Beaudouin. In the late 1920s Holweck was an early pioneer of television, making significant advances in electron focusing and optics. Other important inventions included a highly sensitive and portable gravimetric pendulum, which was used in oil and mining exploration, and a widely used X-ray tube. Among Holweck's last major contributions was an early and important paper on the biological effect of radiation, in collaboration with Salvador Luria and E. Wollman.

== The Resistance ==
At the outbreak of the Second World War Holweck became a technical advisor to the French Prime Minister Paul Reynaud. He also worked with the celebrated aviation pioneer and author Antoine de Saint-Exupéry, to solve practical problems in aircraft operation. During the German occupation of France, Holweck was an active member of the French Resistance, helping British airmen and agents. Betrayed by a notorious traitor, he was arrested and later tortured and murdered by the Gestapo.

== Legacy ==
Several tributes to Holweck's science and personal sacrifice came in the years following the end of the World War II. Members of the British Physical Society and others subscribed to raise money to initiate, in 1945, the Holweck Medal and Prize, awarded in alternate years to French and British physicists. Later the Société Française de Physique added a medal, originally in bronze but now in gold. Also in 1945 an auditorium in the ESPCI was named in his honour.

On 6 September 1946 a diploma of recognition was given to Holweck's family by the United Kingdom and the United States of America, for help given to the escape of allied airmen from occupied France. In Paris a street was named after Holweck in 1986, as well as a technical lycée (highschool) in 1988.
