= Schlieren =

Optical inhomogeneities in transparent media

This video demonstrates a single-pass high-speed schlieren system capturing the transitional ballistic sequence of a handgun.

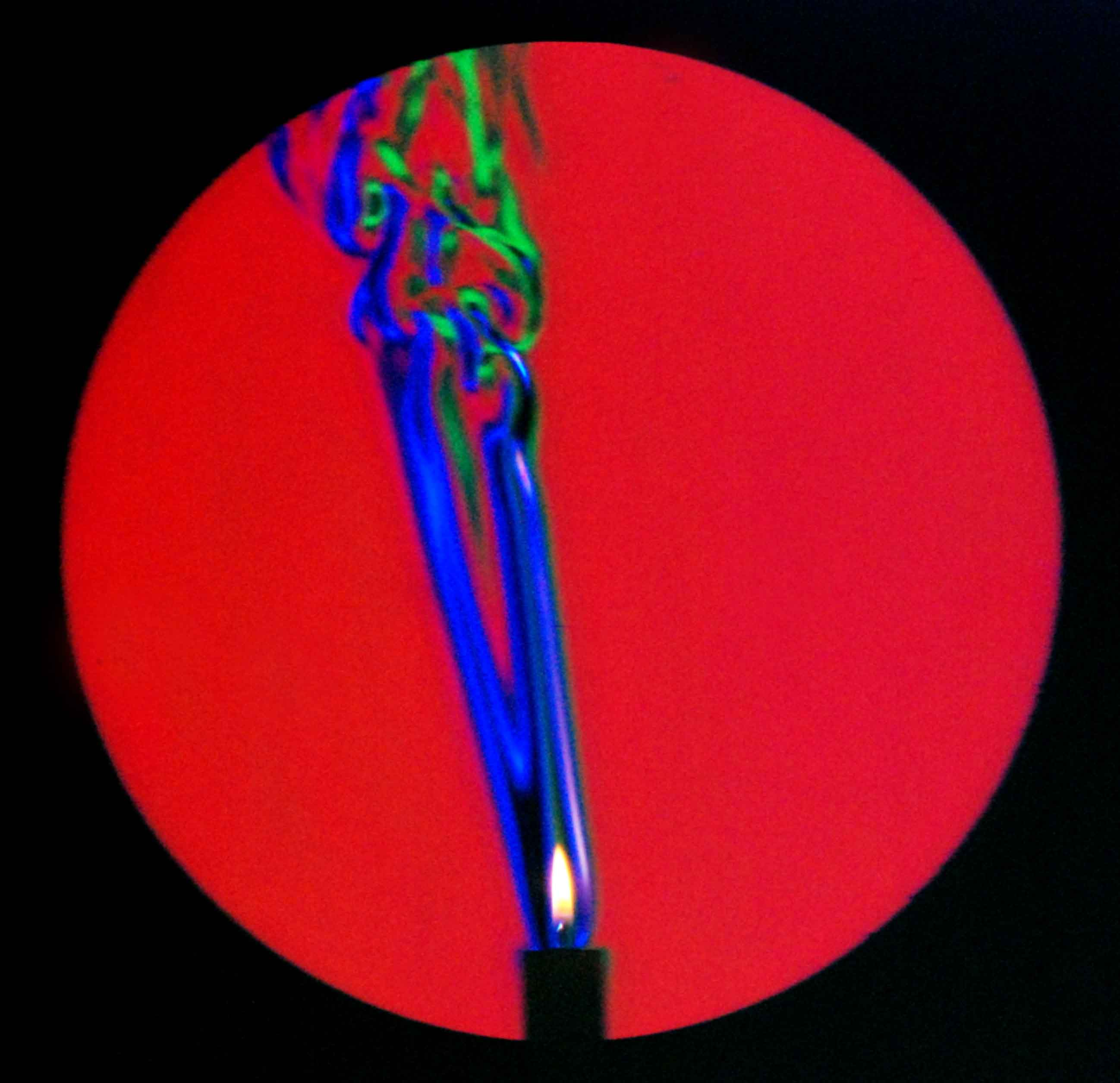
Colored schlieren image of the thermal plume from a burning candle, disturbed by a breeze from the right

Schlieren (/ˈʃlɪərən/ SHLEER-ən; German: [ˈʃliːʁn̩], German for 'streaks') are optical inhomogeneities in transparent media that are not necessarily visible to the human eye. Schlieren physics developed out of the need to produce high-quality lenses devoid of such inhomogeneities. These inhomogeneities are localized differences in optical path length that cause deviations of light rays, especially by refraction. This light deviation can produce localized brightening, darkening, or even color changes in an image, depending on the directions the rays deviate.

== History ==
Schlieren were first observed by Robert Hooke in 1665 using a large concave lens and two candles. One candle served as a light source. The warm air rising from the second candle provided the schliere. In 1858, Léon Foucault described a knife-edge test to accurately measure the shape of concave curved mirrors by reflecting light into a knife edge at or near the mirror's centre of curvature. German physicist August Toepler adapted the principle in 1864 to detect schlieren in glass used to make lenses. In the conventional schlieren system, a point source is used to illuminate the test section containing the schliere. An image of this light is formed using a converging lens (also called a schlieren lens). This image is located at the conjugate distance to the lens according to the thin lens equation: $\frac{1}{f}=\frac{1}{d_o}+\frac{1}{d_i}$ where $f$ is the focal length of the lens, $d_o$ is the distance from the object to the lens and $d_i$ is the distance from the image of the object to the lens. A knife edge at the point source-image location is positioned as to partially block some light from reaching the viewing screen. The illumination of the image is reduced uniformly. A second lens is used to image the test section to the viewing screen. The viewing screen is located a conjugate distance from the plane of the schliere.

== Schlieren flow visualization ==
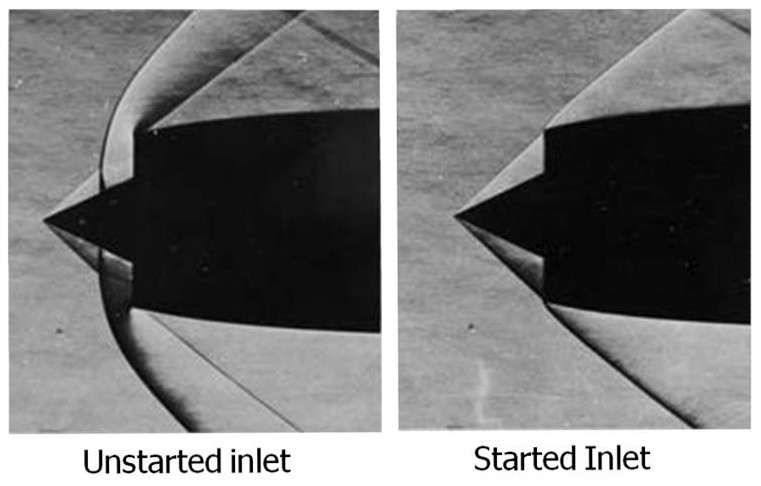
Schlieren flow visualization of a Lockheed SR-71 Pratt & Whitney J58 engine inlet at Mach 2

Schlieren flow visualization is based on the deflection of light by a refractive index gradient. The index gradient is directly related to flow density gradient. The deflected light is compared to undeflected light at a viewing screen. The undisturbed light is partially blocked by a knife edge. The light that is deflected toward or away from the knife edge produces a shadow pattern depending upon whether it was previously blocked or unblocked. This shadow pattern is a light-intensity representation of the expansions (low density regions) and compressions (high density regions) which characterize the flow.

== Schlieren displays ==
The schlieren effect is often used in video projector technologies. The basic idea is some device, such as a liquid crystal light valve, is used to produce schlieren distortions in a controlled manner and these are projected on a screen to produce the desired image. Projection display systems such as the now-obsolete Eidophor and Talaria have used variations of this approach as far back as 1940.

== See also ==
- Background-oriented schlieren technique
- Laser schlieren deflectometry
- Mach–Zehnder interferometer
- Moire deflectometry
- Schlieren imaging
- Schlieren photography
- Shadowgraph
- Synthetic schlieren
