= Vacuum =

Space that is empty of matter

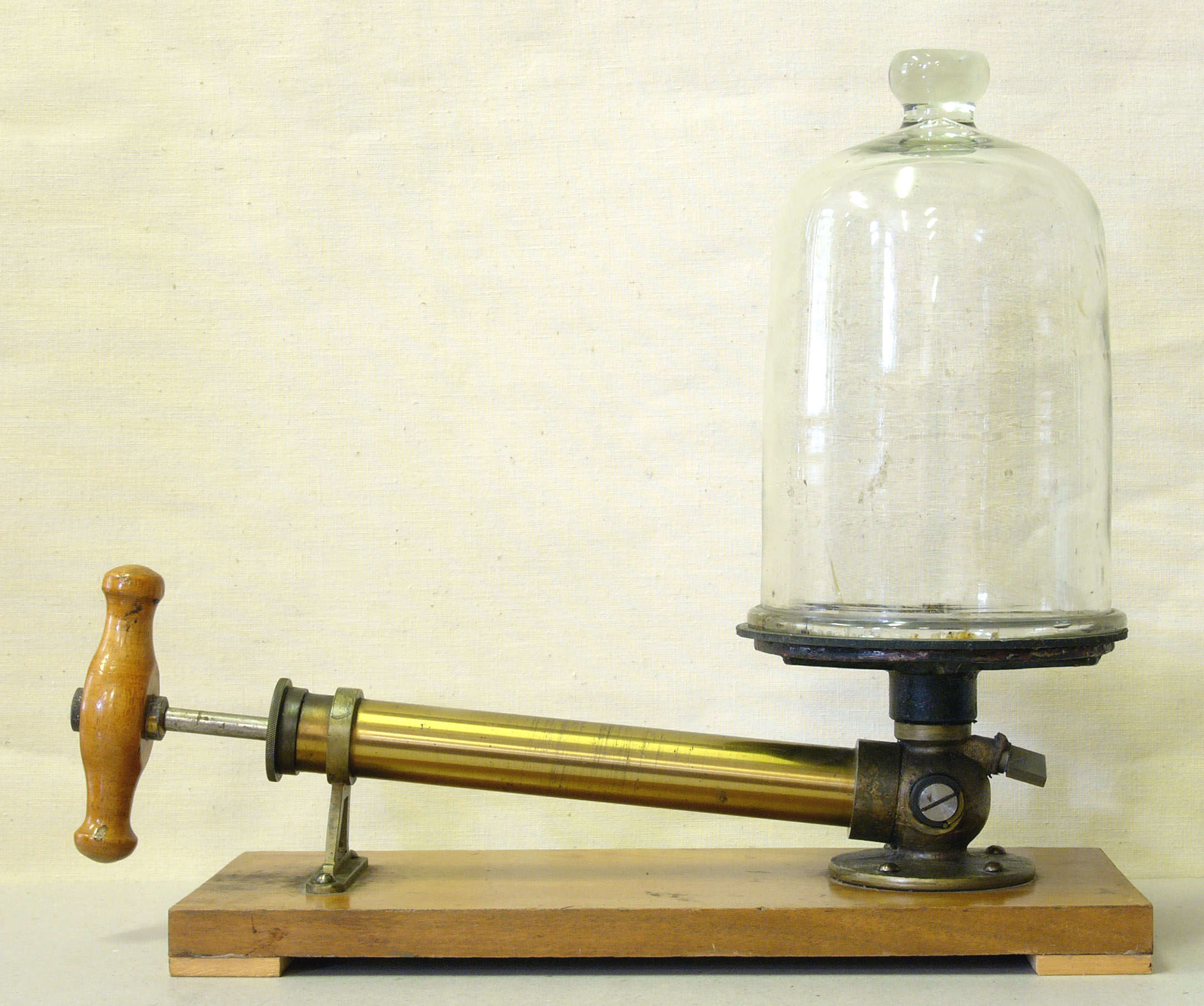
Vacuum pump and bell jar for vacuum experiments, used in science education during the early 20th century, on display in the Schulhistorische Sammlung ('School Historical Museum'), Bremerhaven, Germany

A vacuum (pl.: vacuums or vacua) is space devoid of matter. The word is derived from the Latin adjective vacuus (neuter vacuum) meaning "vacant" or "void". An approximation to such vacuum is a region with a gaseous pressure much less than atmospheric pressure. Physicists often discuss ideal test results that would occur in a perfect vacuum, which they sometimes simply call "vacuum" or free space, and use the term partial vacuum to refer to an actual imperfect vacuum as one might have in a laboratory or in space. In engineering and applied physics on the other hand, vacuum refers to any space in which the pressure is considerably lower than atmospheric pressure. The Latin term in vacuo is used to describe an object that is surrounded by a vacuum. The process in which a mechanical device removes matter from a closed (such as a vacuum chamber) or open (such as a vacuum hose) system in an effort to create a vacuum is called evacuation. Evacuated substances captured, removed from the flowstream in another location, and held under vacuum are sometimes said to be collected by the vacuum system. The mechanical force the atmosphere exerts on air and material obstructing the flow of air into a vacuum is referred to as suction.

The quality of a partial vacuum refers to how closely it approaches a perfect vacuum. Other things being equal, lower gas pressure means higher-quality vacuum. For example, a typical vacuum cleaner produces enough suction to reduce air pressure by around 20%. But higher-quality vacuums are possible. Ultra-high vacuum chambers, common in chemistry, physics, and engineering, operate below one trillionth (10^{−12}) of atmospheric pressure (100 nPa), and can reach around 100 particles/cm^{3}. Outer space is an even higher-quality vacuum, with the equivalent of just a few hydrogen atoms per cubic meter on average in intergalactic space.

Vacuum has been a frequent topic of philosophical debate since ancient Greek times, but was not studied empirically until the 17th century. Clemens Timpler (1605) philosophized about the experimental possibility of producing a vacuum in small tubes. Evangelista Torricelli produced the first laboratory vacuum in 1643, and other experimental techniques were developed as a result of his theories of atmospheric pressure. A Torricellian vacuum is created by filling with mercury a tall glass container closed at one end, and then inverting it in a bowl to contain the mercury (see below).

Vacuum became a valuable industrial tool in the 20th century with the introduction of incandescent light bulbs and vacuum tubes, and a wide array of vacuum technologies has since become available. The development of human spaceflight has raised interest in the impact of vacuum on human health, and on life forms in general.

== Etymology ==
The word vacuum comes from Latin 'an empty space, void', noun use of neuter of vacuus, meaning "empty", related to vacare, meaning "to be empty".

Vacuum is one of the few words in the English language that contains two consecutive instances of the vowel u.

== Historical understanding ==
Historically, there has been much dispute over whether such a thing as a vacuum can exist. Ancient Greek philosophers debated the existence of a vacuum, or void, in the context of atomism, which posited void and atom as the fundamental explanatory elements of physics. Lucretius argued for the existence of vacuum in the first century BC and Hero of Alexandria tried unsuccessfully to create an artificial vacuum in the first century AD.

Following Plato, however, even the abstract concept of a featureless void faced considerable skepticism: it could not be apprehended by the senses, it could not, itself, provide additional explanatory power beyond the physical volume with which it was commensurate and, by definition, it was quite literally nothing at all, which cannot rightly be said to exist. Aristotle believed that no void could occur naturally, because the denser surrounding material continuum would immediately fill any incipient rarity that might give rise to a void. In his Physics, book IV, Aristotle offered numerous arguments against the void: for example, that motion through a medium which offered no impediment could continue ad infinitum, there being no reason that something would come to rest anywhere in particular.

In the medieval Muslim world, the physicist and Islamic scholar Al-Farabi wrote a treatise rejecting the existence of the vacuum in the 10th century. He concluded that air's volume can expand to fill available space, and therefore the concept of a perfect vacuum was incoherent. According to Ahmad Dallal, Abū Rayhān al-Bīrūnī states that "there is no observable evidence that rules out the possibility of vacuum". The suction pump was described by Arab engineer Al-Jazari in the 13th century, and later appeared in Europe from the 15th century.

European scholars such as Roger Bacon, Blasius of Parma and Walter Burley in the 13th and 14th century focused considerable attention on issues concerning the concept of a vacuum. The commonly held view that nature abhorred a vacuum was called horror vacui. There was even speculation that even God could not create a vacuum if he wanted and the 1277 Paris condemnations of Bishop Étienne Tempier, which required there to be no restrictions on the powers of God, led to the conclusion that God could create a vacuum if he so wished. From the 14th century onward increasingly departed from the Aristotelian perspective, scholars widely acknowledged that a supernatural void exists beyond the confines of the cosmos itself by the 17th century. This idea, influenced by Stoic physics, helped to segregate natural and theological concerns.

Almost two thousand years after Plato, René Descartes also proposed a geometrically based alternative theory of atomism, without the problematic nothing–everything dichotomy of void and atom. Although Descartes agreed with the contemporary position, that a vacuum does not occur in nature, the success of his namesake coordinate system and more implicitly, the spatial–corporeal component of his metaphysics would come to define the philosophically modern notion of empty space as a quantified extension of volume. By the ancient definition however, directional information and magnitude were conceptually distinct.

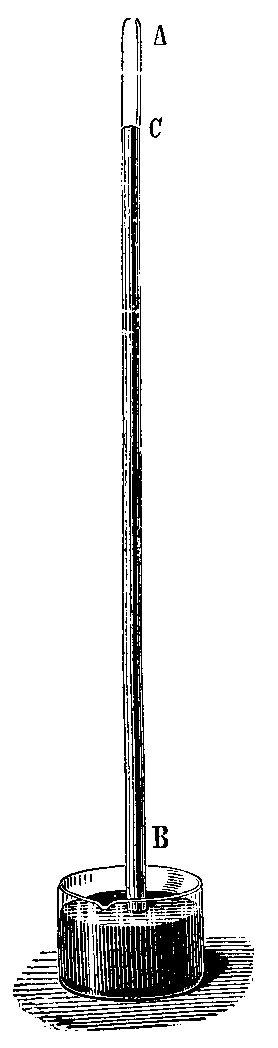
Torricelli's mercury barometer produced one of the first sustained vacuums in a laboratory.

Medieval thought experiments into the idea of a vacuum considered whether a vacuum was present, if only for an instant, between two flat plates when they were rapidly separated. There was much discussion of whether the air moved in quickly enough as the plates were separated, or, as Walter Burley postulated, whether a 'celestial agent' prevented the vacuum arising. Jean Buridan reported in the 14th century that teams of ten horses could not pull open bellows when the port was sealed.

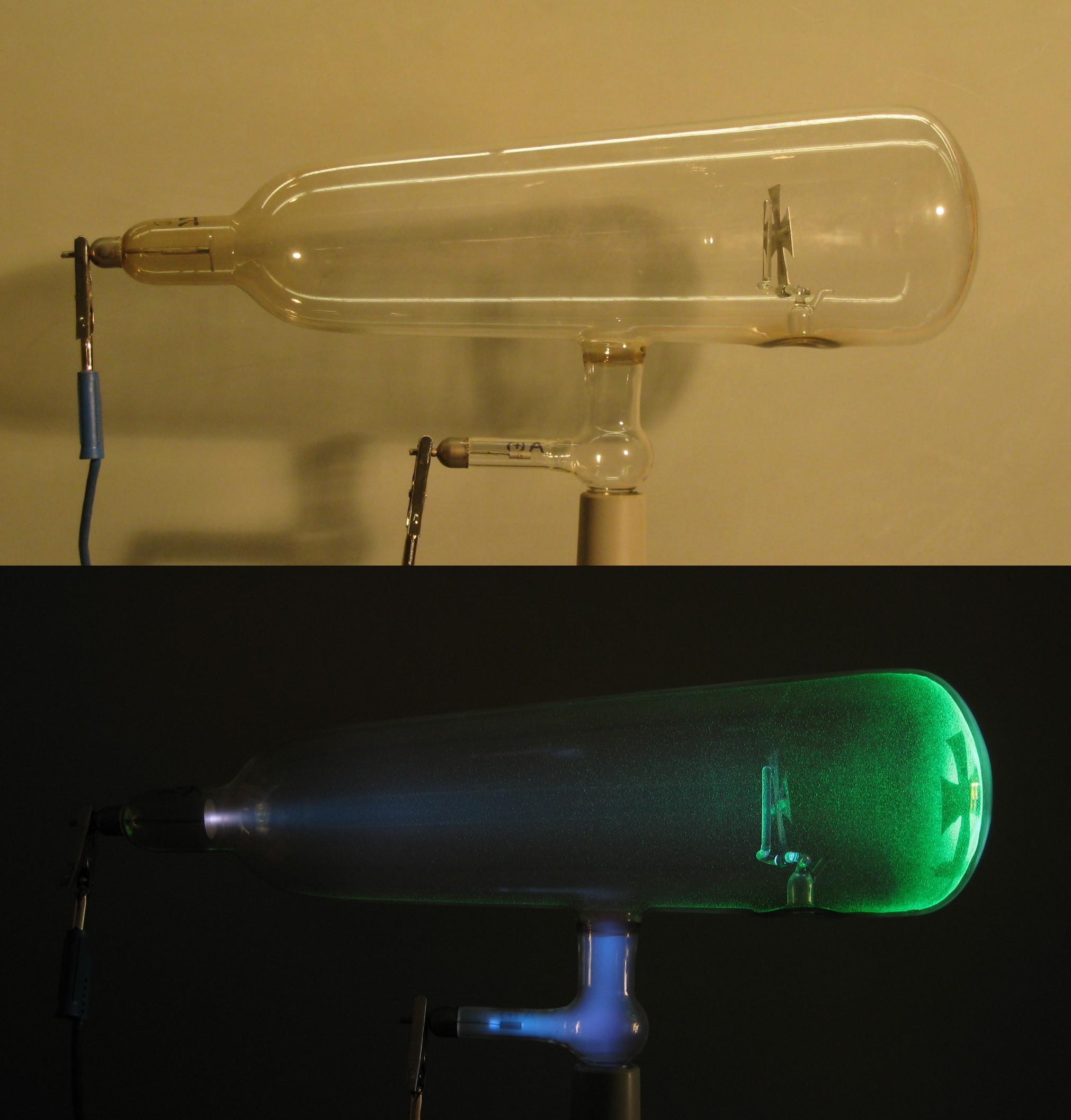
The Crookes tube, used to discover and study cathode rays, was an evolution of the Geissler tube.

The 17th century saw the first attempts to quantify measurements of partial vacuum. Evangelista Torricelli's mercury barometer of 1643 and Blaise Pascal's experiments both demonstrated a partial vacuum.

In 1654, Otto von Guericke invented the first vacuum pump and conducted his famous Magdeburg hemispheres experiment, showing that, owing to atmospheric pressure outside the hemispheres, teams of horses could not separate two hemispheres from which the air had been partially evacuated. Robert Boyle improved Guericke's design and with the help of Robert Hooke further developed vacuum pump technology. Thereafter, research into the partial vacuum lapsed until 1850 when August Toepler invented the Toepler pump and in 1855 when Heinrich Geissler invented the mercury displacement pump, achieving a partial vacuum of about 10 Pa (0.1 Torr). A number of electrical properties become observable at this vacuum level, which renewed interest in further research.

While outer space provides the most rarefied example of a naturally occurring partial vacuum, the heavens were originally thought to be seamlessly filled by a rigid indestructible material called aether. Borrowing somewhat from the pneuma of Stoic physics, aether came to be regarded as the rarefied air from which it took its name, (see Aether (mythology)). Early theories of light posited a ubiquitous terrestrial and celestial medium through which light propagated. Additionally, the concept informed Isaac Newton's explanations of both refraction and of radiant heat. 19th century experiments into this luminiferous aether attempted to detect a minute drag on the Earth's orbit. While the Earth does, in fact, move through a relatively dense medium in comparison to that of interstellar space, the drag is so minuscule that it could not be detected. In 1912, astronomer Henry Pickering commented: "While the interstellar absorbing medium may be simply the ether, [it] is characteristic of a gas, and free gaseous molecules are certainly there". Thereafter, however, luminiferous aether was discarded.

Later, in 1930, Paul Dirac proposed a model of the vacuum as an infinite sea of particles possessing negative energy, called the Dirac sea. This theory helped refine the predictions of his earlier formulated Dirac equation, and successfully predicted the existence of the positron, confirmed two years later. Werner Heisenberg's uncertainty principle, formulated in 1927, predicted a fundamental limit within which instantaneous position and momentum, or energy and time can be measured. These far-reaching consequences also threatened whether the "emptiness" of space between particles exists.

== Classical field theories ==
The strictest criterion to define a vacuum is a region of space and time where all the components of the stress–energy tensor are zero. This means that this region is devoid of energy and momentum, and by consequence, it must be empty of particles and other physical fields (such as electromagnetism) that contain energy and momentum.

=== Gravity ===
In general relativity, a vanishing stress–energy tensor implies, through Einstein field equations, the vanishing of all the components of the Ricci tensor. Vacuum does not mean that the curvature of space-time is necessarily flat: the gravitational field can still produce curvature in a vacuum in the form of tidal forces and gravitational waves (technically, these phenomena are the components of the Weyl tensor). The black hole (with zero electric charge) is an elegant example of a region completely "filled" with vacuum, but still showing a strong curvature.

=== Electromagnetism ===
In classical electromagnetism, the vacuum of free space, or sometimes just free space or perfect vacuum, is a standard reference medium for electromagnetic effects. Some authors refer to this reference medium as classical vacuum, a terminology intended to separate this concept from QED vacuum or QCD vacuum, where vacuum fluctuations can produce transient virtual particle densities and a relative permittivity and relative permeability that are not identically unity.

In the theory of classical electromagnetism, free space has the following properties:

- Electromagnetic radiation travels, when unobstructed, at the speed of light, the defined value 299,792,458 m/s in SI units.
- The superposition principle is always exactly true. For example, the electric potential generated by two charges is the simple addition of the potentials generated by each charge in isolation. The value of the electric field at any point around these two charges is found by calculating the vector sum of the two electric fields from each of the charges acting alone.
- The permittivity and permeability are exactly the electric constant ε_{0} and magnetic constant μ_{0}, respectively (in SI units), or exactly 1 (in Gaussian units).
- The characteristic impedance (η) equals the impedance of free space Z_{0} ≈ 376.73 Ω.

The vacuum of classical electromagnetism can be viewed as an idealized electromagnetic medium with the constitutive relations in SI units:

$$\boldsymbol D(\boldsymbol r,\ t) = \varepsilon_0 \boldsymbol E(\boldsymbol r,\ t)\,$$
$$\boldsymbol H(\boldsymbol r,\ t) = \frac{1}{\mu_0} \boldsymbol B(\boldsymbol r,\ t)\,$$

relating the electric displacement field D to the electric field E and the magnetic field or H-field H to the magnetic induction or B-field B. Here r is a spatial location and t is time.

== Quantum mechanics ==
A video of an experiment showing vacuum fluctuations (in the red ring) amplified by spontaneous parametric down-conversion.

In quantum mechanics and quantum field theory, the vacuum is defined as the state (that is, the solution to the equations of the theory) with the lowest possible energy (the ground state of the Hilbert space). In quantum electrodynamics this vacuum is referred to as 'QED vacuum' to distinguish it from the vacuum of quantum chromodynamics, denoted as QCD vacuum. QED vacuum is a state with no matter particles (hence the name), and no photons. As described above, this state is impossible to achieve experimentally. (Even if every matter particle could somehow be removed from a volume, it would be impossible to eliminate all the blackbody photons.) Nonetheless, it provides a good model for realizable vacuum, and agrees with a number of experimental observations as described next.

QED vacuum has interesting and complex properties. In QED vacuum, the electric and magnetic fields have zero average values, but their variances are not zero. As a result, QED vacuum contains vacuum fluctuations (virtual particles that hop into and out of existence), and a finite energy called vacuum energy. Vacuum fluctuations are an essential and ubiquitous part of quantum field theory. Some experimentally verified effects of vacuum fluctuations include spontaneous emission and the Lamb shift. Coulomb's law and the electric potential in vacuum near an electric charge are modified.

Theoretically, in QCD multiple vacuum states can coexist. The starting and ending of cosmological inflation is thought to have arisen from transitions between different vacuum states. For theories obtained by quantization of a classical theory, each stationary point of the energy in the configuration space gives rise to a single vacuum. String theory is believed to have a huge number of vacua –the so-called string theory landscape.

== Outer space ==
The structure of the magnetosphere is not a perfect vacuum, but a tenuous plasma awash with charged particles, free elements such as hydrogen, helium and oxygen, and electromagnetic fields.

Outer space has very low density and pressure, and is the closest physical approximation of a perfect vacuum. But no vacuum is truly perfect, not even in interstellar space, where there are still a few hydrogen atoms per cubic meter.

Stars, planets, and moons keep their atmospheres by gravitational attraction, and as such, atmospheres have no clearly delineated boundary: the density of atmospheric gas simply decreases with distance from the object. The Earth's atmospheric pressure drops to about 32 millipascals (4.6×10^{−6} psi) at 100 kilometres (62 mi) of altitude, the Kármán line, which is a common definition of the boundary with outer space. Beyond this line, isotropic gas pressure rapidly becomes insignificant when compared to radiation pressure from the Sun and the dynamic pressure of the solar wind, so the definition of pressure becomes difficult to interpret. The thermosphere in this range has large gradients of pressure, temperature and composition, and varies greatly due to space weather. Astrophysicists prefer to use number density to describe these environments, in units of particles per cubic centimetre.

But although it meets the definition of outer space, the atmospheric density within the first few hundred kilometers above the Kármán line is still sufficient to produce significant drag on satellites. Most artificial satellites operate in this region, called low Earth orbit, and must fire their engines every couple of weeks or a few times a year (depending on solar activity). The drag here is low enough that it could theoretically be overcome by radiation pressure on solar sails, a proposed propulsion system for interplanetary travel.

All of the observable universe is filled with large numbers of photons, the so-called cosmic background radiation, and quite likely a correspondingly large number of neutrinos. The current temperature of this radiation is about 3 K (−270.15 °C; −454.27 °F).

== Measurement ==
The quality of a vacuum is indicated by the amount of matter remaining in the system, so that a high quality vacuum is one with very little matter left in it. Vacuum is primarily measured by its absolute pressure, but a complete characterization requires further parameters, such as temperature and chemical composition. One of the most important parameters is the mean free path (MFP) of residual gases, which indicates the average distance that molecules will travel between collisions with each other. As the gas density decreases, the MFP increases, and when the MFP is longer than the chamber, pump, spacecraft, or other objects present, the continuum assumptions of fluid mechanics do not apply. This vacuum state is called high vacuum, and the study of fluid flows in this regime is called particle gas dynamics. The MFP of air at atmospheric pressure is very short, 70 nm, but at 100 mPa (≈10^{−3} Torr) the MFP of room temperature air is roughly 100 mm, which is on the order of everyday objects such as vacuum tubes. The Crookes radiometer turns when the MFP is larger than the size of the vanes.

Vacuum quality is subdivided into ranges according to the technology required to achieve it or measure it. These ranges were defined in ISO 3529-1:2019 as shown in the following table (100 Pa corresponds to 0.75 Torr; Torr is a non-SI unit):

Pressure range	Definition	The reasoning for the definition of the ranges is as follows (typical circumstances):
Prevailing atmospheric pressure (31 kPa to 110 kPa) to 100 Pa	low (rough) vacuum	Pressure can be achieved by simple materials (e.g. regular steel) and positive displacement vacuum pumps; viscous flow regime for gases
<100 Pa to 0.1 Pa	medium (fine) vacuum	Pressure can be achieved by elaborate materials (e.g. stainless steel) and positive displacement vacuum pumps; transitional flow regime for gases
<0.1 Pa to 1×10^{−6} Pa	high vacuum (HV)	Pressure can be achieved by elaborate materials (e.g. stainless steel), elastomer sealings and high vacuum pumps; molecular flow regime for gases
<1×10^{−6} Pa to 1×10^{−9} Pa	ultra-high vacuum (UHV)	Pressure can be achieved by elaborate materials (e.g. low-carbon stainless steel), metal sealings, special surface preparations and cleaning, bake-out and high vacuum pumps; molecular flow regime for gases
below 1×10^{−9} Pa	extreme-high vacuum (XHV)	Pressure can be achieved by sophisticated materials (e.g. vacuum fired low-carbon stainless steel, aluminium, copper-beryllium, titanium), metal sealings, special surface preparations and cleaning, bake-out and additional getter pumps; molecular flow regime for gases

- Atmospheric pressure is variable but 101.325 and 100 kilopascals (1013.25 and 1000.00 mbar) are common standard or reference pressures.
- Deep space is generally much more empty than any artificial vacuum. It may or may not meet the definition of high vacuum above, depending on what region of space and astronomical bodies are being considered. For example, the MFP of interplanetary space is smaller than the size of the Solar System, but larger than small planets and moons. As a result, the solar wind exhibits continuum flow on the scale of the Solar System, but must be considered a bombardment of particles with respect to the Earth and Moon.
- Perfect vacuum is an ideal state of no particles at all. It cannot be achieved in a laboratory, although there may be small volumes which, for a brief moment, happen to have no particles of matter in them. Even if all particles of matter were removed, there would still be photons, as well as dark energy, virtual particles, and other aspects of the quantum vacuum.

=== Relative versus absolute measurement ===
Vacuum is measured in units of pressure, typically as a subtraction relative to ambient atmospheric pressure on Earth. But the amount of relative measurable vacuum varies with local conditions. On the surface of Venus, where ground-level atmospheric pressure is much higher than on Earth, much higher relative vacuum readings would be possible. On the surface of the Moon with almost no atmosphere, it would be extremely difficult to create a measurable vacuum relative to the local environment.

Similarly, much higher than normal relative vacuum readings are possible deep in the Earth's ocean. A submarine maintaining an internal pressure of 1 atmosphere submerged to a depth of 10 atmospheres (98 metres; a 9.8-metre column of seawater has the equivalent weight of 1 atm) is effectively a vacuum chamber keeping out the crushing exterior water pressures, though the 1 atm inside the submarine would not normally be considered a vacuum.

Therefore, to properly understand the following discussions of vacuum measurement, it is important that the reader assumes the relative measurements are being done on Earth at sea level, at exactly 1 atmosphere of ambient atmospheric pressure.

=== Measurements relative to 1 atm ===
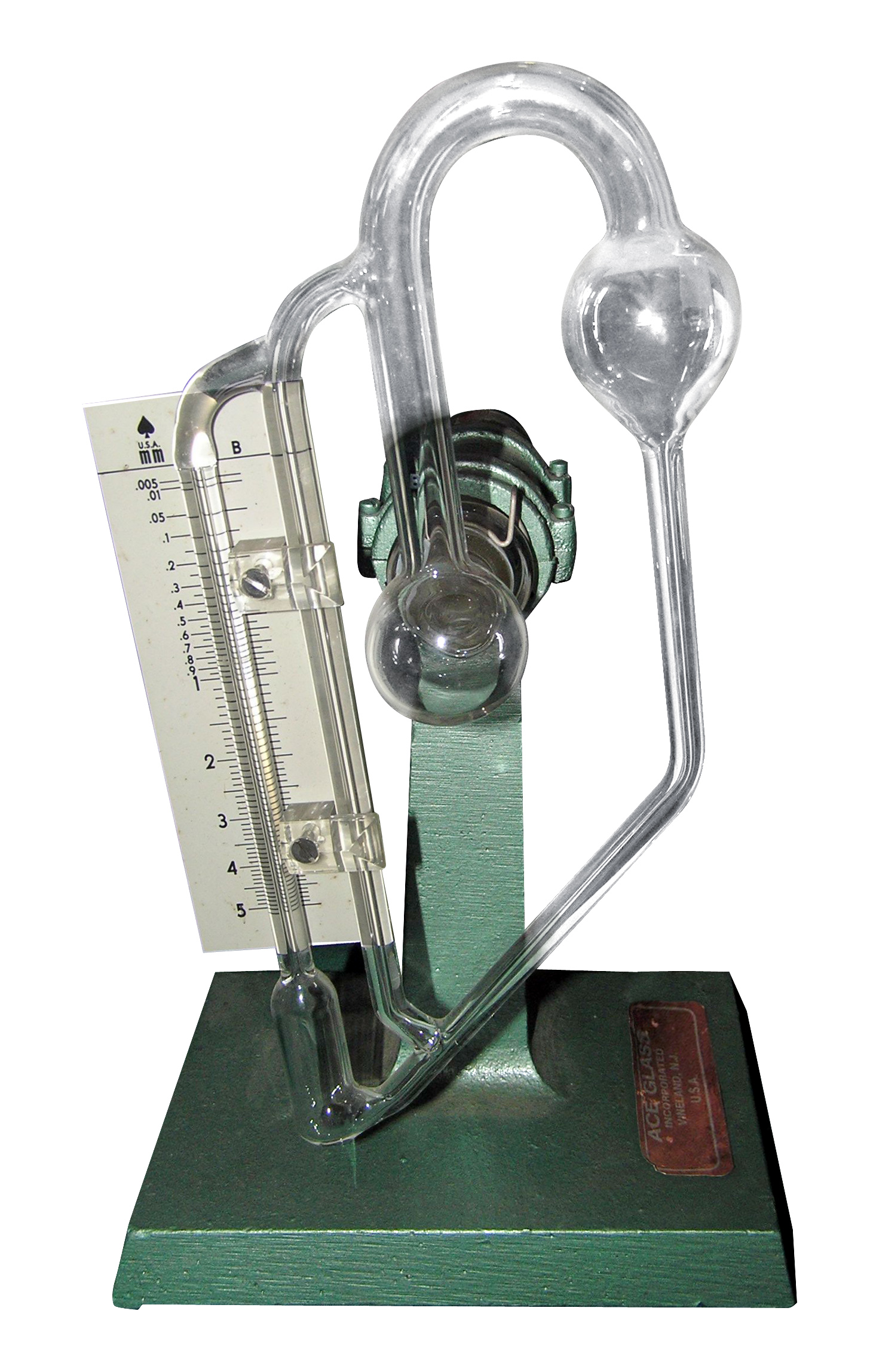
A glass McLeod gauge, drained of mercury

The SI unit of pressure is the pascal (symbol Pa), but vacuum is often measured in torrs, named for an Italian physicist Torricelli (1608–1647). A torr is equal to the displacement of a millimeter of mercury (mmHg) in a manometer with 1 torr equaling 133.3223684 pascals above absolute zero pressure. Vacuum is often also measured on the barometric scale or as a percentage of atmospheric pressure in bars or atmospheres. Low vacuum is often measured in millimeters of mercury (mmHg) or pascals (Pa) below standard atmospheric pressure. "Below atmospheric" means that the absolute pressure is equal to the current atmospheric pressure.

In other words, most low vacuum gauges that read, for example 50.79 Torr. Many inexpensive low vacuum gauges have a margin of error and may report a vacuum of 0 Torr but in practice this generally requires a two-stage rotary vane or other medium type of vacuum pump to go much beyond (lower than) 1 torr.

=== Measuring instruments ===
Many devices are used to measure the pressure in a vacuum, depending on what range of vacuum is needed.

Hydrostatic gauges (such as the mercury column manometer) consist of a vertical column of liquid in a tube whose ends are exposed to different pressures. The column will rise or fall until its weight is in equilibrium with the pressure differential between the two ends of the tube. The simplest design is a closed-end U-shaped tube, one side of which is connected to the region of interest. Any fluid can be used, but mercury is preferred for its high density and low vapour pressure. Simple hydrostatic gauges can measure pressures ranging from 1 torr (100 Pa) to above atmospheric. An important variation is the McLeod gauge which isolates a known volume of vacuum and compresses it to multiply the height variation of the liquid column. The McLeod gauge can measure vacuums as high as 10^{−6} torr (0.1 mPa), which is the lowest direct measurement of pressure that is possible with current technology. Other vacuum gauges can measure lower pressures, but only indirectly by measurement of other pressure-controlled properties. These indirect measurements must be calibrated via a direct measurement, most commonly a McLeod gauge.

The kenotometer is a particular type of hydrostatic gauge, typically used in power plants using steam turbines. The kenotometer measures the vacuum in the steam space of the condenser, that is, the exhaust of the last stage of the turbine.

Mechanical or elastic gauges depend on a Bourdon tube, diaphragm, or capsule, usually made of metal, which will change shape in response to the pressure of the region in question. A variation on this idea is the capacitance manometer, in which the diaphragm makes up a part of a capacitor. A change in pressure leads to the flexure of the diaphragm, which results in a change in capacitance. These gauges are effective from 10^{3} torr to 10^{−4} torr, and beyond.

Thermal conductivity gauges rely on the fact that the ability of a gas to conduct heat decreases with pressure. In this type of gauge, a wire filament is heated by running current through it. A thermocouple or Resistance Temperature Detector (RTD) can then be used to measure the temperature of the filament. This temperature is dependent on the rate at which the filament loses heat to the surrounding gas, and therefore on the thermal conductivity. A common variant is the Pirani gauge which uses a single platinum filament as both the heated element and RTD. These gauges are accurate from 10 torr to 10^{−3} torr, but they are sensitive to the chemical composition of the gases being measured.

Ionization gauges are used in ultrahigh vacuum. They come in two types: hot cathode and cold cathode. In the hot cathode version an electrically heated filament produces an electron beam. The electrons travel through the gauge and ionize gas molecules around them. The resulting ions are collected at a negative electrode. The current depends on the number of ions, which depends on the pressure in the gauge. Hot cathode gauges are accurate from 10^{−3} torr to 10^{−10} torr. The principle behind cold cathode version is the same, except that electrons are produced in a discharge created by a high voltage electrical discharge. Cold cathode gauges are accurate from 10^{−2} torr to 10^{−9} torr. Ionization gauge calibration is very sensitive to construction geometry, chemical composition of gases being measured, corrosion and surface deposits. Their calibration can be invalidated by activation at atmospheric pressure or low vacuum. The composition of gases at high vacuums will usually be unpredictable, so a mass spectrometer must be used in conjunction with the ionization gauge for accurate measurement.

== Uses ==
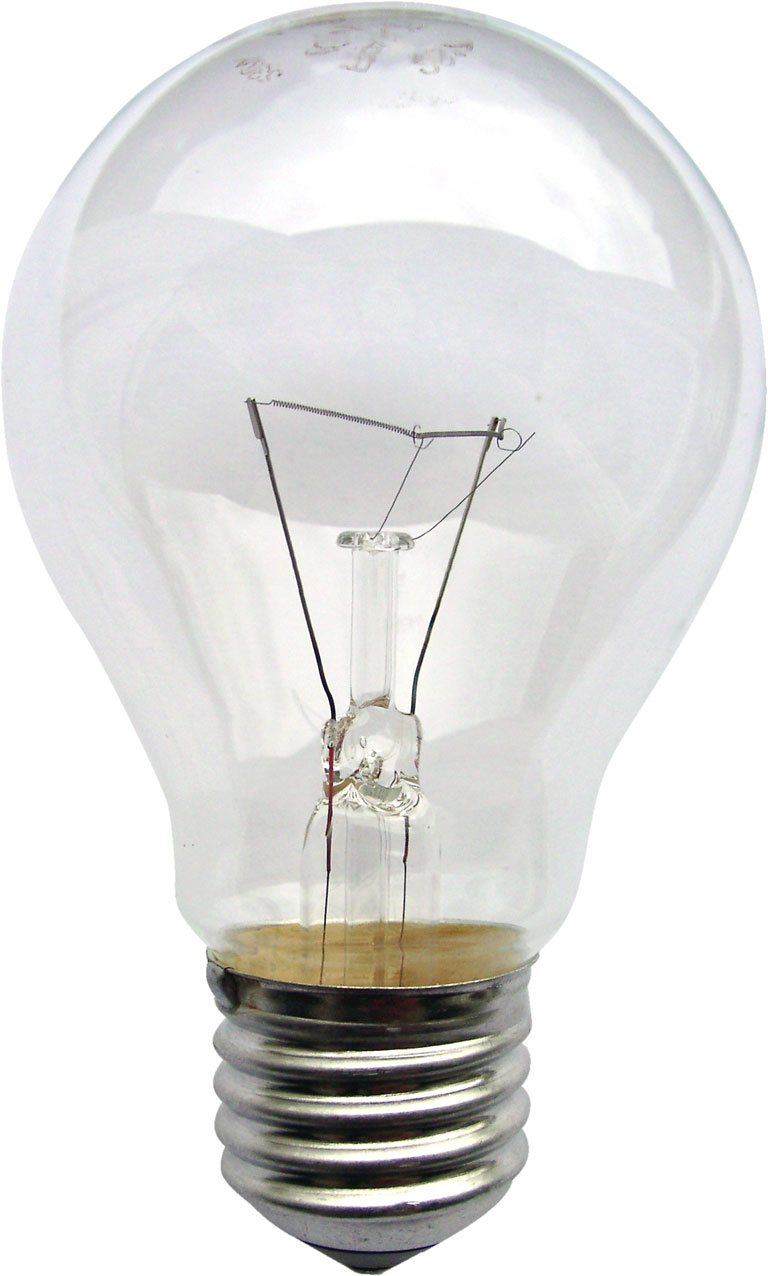
Light bulbs contain a partial vacuum, usually backfilled with argon, which protects the tungsten filament

Vacuum is useful in a variety of processes and devices. Its first widespread use was in the incandescent light bulb to protect the filament from chemical degradation. The chemical inertness produced by a vacuum is also useful for electron-beam welding, cold welding, vacuum packing and vacuum frying. Ultra-high vacuum is used in the study of atomically clean substrates, as only a very good vacuum preserves atomic-scale clean surfaces for a reasonably long time (on the order of minutes to days). High to ultra-high vacuum removes the obstruction of air, allowing particle beams to deposit or remove materials without contamination. This is the principle behind chemical vapor deposition, physical vapor deposition, and dry etching which are essential to the fabrication of semiconductors and optical coatings, and to surface science. The reduction of convection provides the thermal insulation of thermos bottles. Deep vacuum lowers the boiling point of liquids and promotes low temperature outgassing which is used in freeze drying, adhesive preparation, distillation, metallurgy, and process purging. The electrical properties of vacuum make electron microscopes and vacuum tubes possible, including cathode-ray tubes. Vacuum interrupters are used in electrical switchgear. Vacuum arc processes are industrially important for production of certain grades of steel or high purity materials. The elimination of air friction is useful for flywheel energy storage and ultracentrifuges.

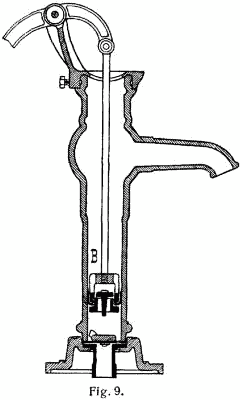
This shallow water well pump reduces atmospheric air pressure inside the pump chamber. Atmospheric pressure extends down into the well, and forces water up the pipe into the pump to balance the reduced pressure. Above-ground pump chambers are only effective to a depth of approximately 9 meters due to the water column weight balancing the atmospheric pressure.

=== Vacuum-driven machines ===
Vacuums are commonly used to produce suction, which has an even wider variety of applications. The Newcomen steam engine used vacuum instead of pressure to drive a piston. In the 19th century, vacuum was used for traction on Isambard Kingdom Brunel's experimental atmospheric railway. Vacuum brakes were once widely used on trains in the UK but, except on heritage railways, they have been replaced by air brakes.

Manifold vacuum can be used to drive accessories on automobiles. The best known application is the vacuum servo, used to provide power assistance for the brakes. Obsolete applications include vacuum-driven windscreen wipers and Autovac fuel pumps. Some aircraft instruments (Attitude Indicator (AI) and the Heading Indicator (HI)) are typically vacuum-powered, as protection against loss of all (electrically powered) instruments, since early aircraft often did not have electrical systems, and since there are two readily available sources of vacuum on a moving aircraft, the engine and an external venturi. Vacuum induction melting uses electromagnetic induction within a vacuum.

Maintaining a vacuum in the condenser is an important aspect of the efficient operation of steam turbines. A steam jet ejector or liquid ring vacuum pump is used for this purpose. The typical vacuum maintained in the condenser steam space at the exhaust of the turbine (also called condenser backpressure) is in the range 5 to 15 kPa (absolute), depending on the type of condenser and the ambient conditions.

=== Outgassing ===
Evaporation and sublimation into a vacuum is called outgassing. All materials, solid or liquid, have a small vapour pressure, and their outgassing becomes important when the vacuum pressure falls below this vapour pressure. Outgassing has the same effect as a leak and will limit the achievable vacuum. Outgassing products may condense on nearby colder surfaces, which can be troublesome if they obscure optical instruments or react with other materials. This is of great concern to space missions, where an obscured telescope or solar cell can ruin an expensive mission.

The most prevalent outgassing product in vacuum systems is water absorbed by chamber materials. It can be reduced by desiccating or baking the chamber, and removing absorbent materials. Outgassed water can condense in the oil of rotary vane pumps and reduce their net speed drastically if gas ballasting is not used. High vacuum systems must be clean and free of organic matter to minimize outgassing.

Ultra-high vacuum systems are usually baked, preferably under vacuum, to temporarily raise the vapour pressure of all outgassing materials and boil them off. Once the bulk of the outgassing materials are boiled off and evacuated, the system may be cooled to lower vapour pressures and minimize residual outgassing during actual operation. Some systems are cooled well below room temperature by liquid nitrogen to shut down residual outgassing and simultaneously cryopump the system.

=== Pumping and ambient air pressure ===
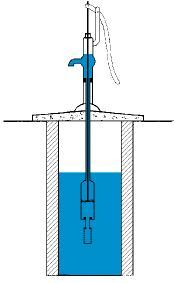
Deep wells have the pump chamber down in the well close to the water surface, or in the water. A "sucker rod" extends from the handle down the center of the pipe deep into the well to operate the plunger. The pump handle acts as a heavy counterweight against both the sucker rod weight and the weight of the water column standing on the upper plunger up to ground level.

Fluids cannot generally be pulled, so a vacuum cannot be created by suction. Suction can spread and dilute a vacuum by letting a higher pressure push fluids into it, but the vacuum has to be created first before suction can occur. The easiest way to create an artificial vacuum is to expand the volume of a container. For example, the diaphragm muscle expands the chest cavity, which causes the volume of the lungs to increase. This expansion reduces the pressure and creates a partial vacuum, which is soon filled by air pushed in by atmospheric pressure.

To continue evacuating a chamber indefinitely without requiring infinite growth, a compartment of the vacuum can be repeatedly closed off, exhausted, and expanded again. This is the principle behind positive displacement pumps, like the manual water pump for example. Inside the pump, a mechanism expands a small sealed cavity to create a vacuum. Because of the pressure differential, some fluid from the chamber (or the well, in our example) is pushed into the pump's small cavity. The pump's cavity is then sealed from the chamber, opened to the atmosphere, and squeezed back to a minute size.

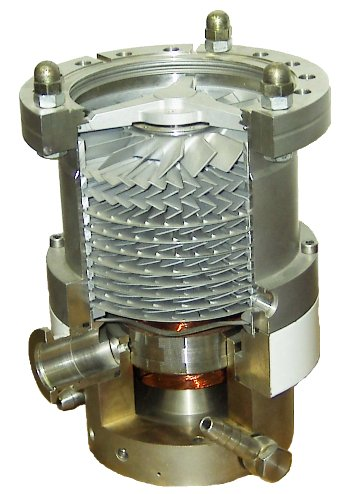
A cutaway view of a turbomolecular pump, a momentum transfer pump used to achieve high vacuum

The above explanation is merely a simple introduction to vacuum pumping, and is not representative of the entire range of pumps in use. Many variations of the positive displacement pump have been developed, and many other pump designs rely on fundamentally different principles. Momentum transfer pumps, which bear some similarities to dynamic pumps used at higher pressures, can achieve much higher quality vacuums than positive displacement pumps. Entrapment pumps can capture gases in a solid or absorbed state, often with no moving parts, no seals and no vibration. None of these pumps are universal; each type has important performance limitations. They all share a difficulty in pumping low molecular weight gases, especially hydrogen, helium, and neon.

The lowest pressure that can be attained in a system is also dependent on many things other than the nature of the pumps. Multiple pumps may be connected in series, called stages, to achieve higher vacuums. The choice of seals, chamber geometry, materials, and pump-down procedures will all have an impact. Collectively, these are called vacuum technique. And sometimes, the final pressure is not the only relevant characteristic. Pumping systems differ in oil contamination, vibration, preferential pumping of certain gases, pump-down speeds, intermittent duty cycle, reliability, or tolerance to high leakage rates.

In ultra high vacuum systems, some very "odd" leakage paths and outgassing sources must be considered. The water absorption of aluminium and palladium becomes an unacceptable source of outgassing, and even the adsorptivity of hard metals such as stainless steel or titanium must be considered. Some oils and greases will boil off in extreme vacuums. The permeability of the metallic chamber walls may have to be considered, and the grain direction of the metallic flanges should be parallel to the flange face.

The lowest pressures currently achievable in laboratory are about 1×10^{−13} torrs (13 pPa). However, pressures as low as 5×10^{−17} torrs (6.7 fPa) have been indirectly measured in a 4 K (−269.15 °C; −452.47 °F) cryogenic vacuum system. This corresponds to ≈100 particles/cm^{3}.

== Effects on humans and animals ==
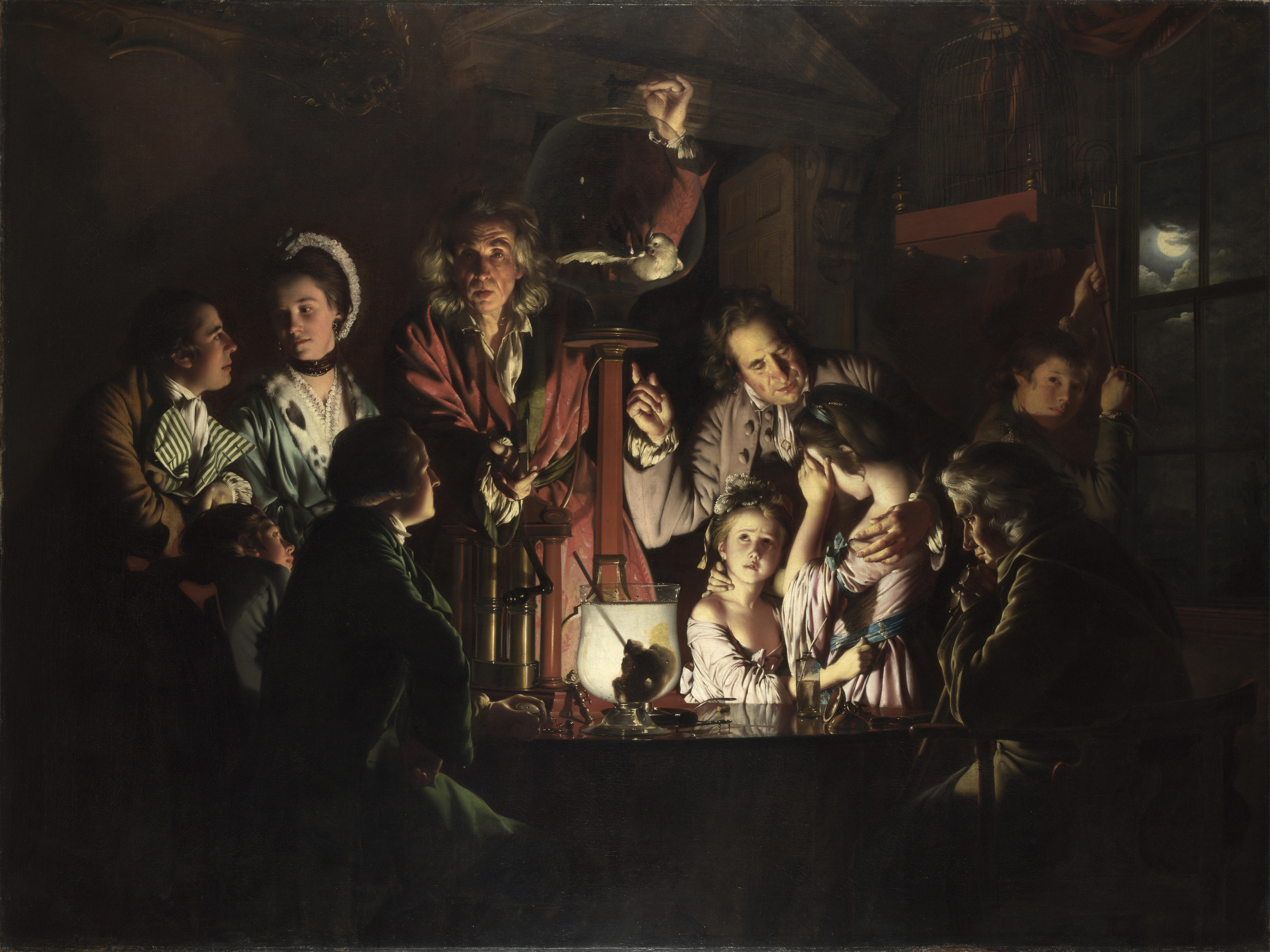
This painting, An Experiment on a Bird in the Air Pump by Joseph Wright of Derby, 1768, depicts an experiment performed by Robert Boyle in 1660.

Humans and animals exposed to vacuum will lose consciousness after a few seconds and die of hypoxia within minutes, but the symptoms are not nearly as graphic as commonly depicted in media and popular culture. The reduction in pressure lowers the temperature at which blood and other body fluids boil, but the elastic pressure of blood vessels ensures that this boiling point remains above the internal body temperature of 37 °C. Although the blood will not boil, the formation of gas bubbles in bodily fluids at reduced pressures, known as ebullism, is still a concern. The gas may bloat the body to twice its normal size and slow circulation, but tissues are elastic and porous enough to prevent rupture. Swelling and ebullism can be restrained by containment in a pressure suit. Shuttle astronauts wore a fitted elastic garment called the Crew Altitude Protection Suit (CAPS) which prevents ebullism at pressures as low as 2 kPa (15 Torr). Rapid boiling will cool the skin and create frost, particularly in the mouth, but this is not a significant hazard.

Animal experiments show that rapid and complete recovery is normal for exposures shorter than 90 seconds, while longer full-body exposures are fatal and resuscitation has never been successful. A study by NASA on eight chimpanzees found all of them survived two and a half minute exposures to vacuum. There is only a limited amount of data available from human accidents, but it is consistent with animal data. Limbs may be exposed for much longer if breathing is not impaired. Robert Boyle was the first to show in 1660 that vacuum is lethal to small animals.

An experiment indicates that plants are able to survive in a low pressure environment (1.5 kPa) for about 30 minutes.

Cold or oxygen-rich atmospheres can sustain life at pressures much lower than atmospheric, as long as the density of oxygen is similar to that of standard sea-level atmosphere. The colder air temperatures found at altitudes of up to 3 km generally compensate for the lower pressures there. Above this altitude, oxygen enrichment is necessary to prevent altitude sickness in humans that did not undergo prior acclimatization, and spacesuits are necessary to prevent ebullism above 19 km. Most spacesuits use only 20 kPa (150 Torr) of pure oxygen. This pressure is high enough to prevent ebullism, but decompression sickness and gas embolisms can still occur if decompression rates are not managed.

Rapid decompression can be much more dangerous than vacuum exposure itself. Even if the victim does not hold his or her breath, venting through the windpipe may be too slow to prevent the fatal rupture of the delicate alveoli of the lungs. Eardrums and sinuses may be ruptured by rapid decompression, soft tissues may bruise and seep blood, and the stress of shock will accelerate oxygen consumption leading to hypoxia. Injuries caused by rapid decompression are called barotrauma. A pressure drop of 13 kPa (100 Torr), which produces no symptoms if it is gradual, may be fatal if it occurs suddenly.

Some extremophile microorganisms, such as tardigrades, can survive vacuum conditions for periods of days or weeks.

== Examples ==
	Pressure (Pa if not explained)	Pressure (Torr, atm)	Mean free path	Molecules per cm^{3}
Standard atmosphere, for comparison	101.325 kPa	760 torrs (1.00 atm)	66 nm	2.5×10^{19}
Intense hurricane	approx. 87 to 95 kPa	650 to 710		
Vacuum cleaner	approximately 80 kPa	600	70 nm	10^{19}
Steam turbine exhaust (Condenser backpressure)	9 kPa			
liquid ring vacuum pump	approximately 3.2 kPa	24 torrs (0.032 atm)	1.75 μm	10^{18}
Mars atmosphere	1.155 kPa to 0.03 kPa (mean 0.6 kPa)	8.66 to 0.23 torrs (0.01139 to 0.00030 atm)		
Freeze drying	100 to 10	1 to 0.1	100 μm to 1 mm	10^{16} to 10^{15}
Incandescent light bulb	10 to 1	0.1 to 0.01 torrs (0.000132 to 1.3×10^{−5} atm)	1 mm to 1 cm	10^{15} to 10^{14}
Thermos bottle	1 to 0.01	1×10^{−2} to 1×10^{−4} torrs (1.316×10^{−5} to 1.3×10^{−7} atm)	1 cm to 1 m	10^{14} to 10^{12}
Earth thermosphere	1 Pa to 1×10^{−7}	10^{−2} to 10^{−9}	1 cm to 100 km	10^{14} to 10^{7}
Vacuum tube	1×10^{−5} to 1×10^{−8}	10^{−7} to 10^{−10}	1 to 1,000 km	10^{9} to 10^{6}
Pressure on the Moon	approximately 1×10^{−9}	10^{−11}	10,000 km	4×10^{5}
Cryopumped MBE chamber	1×10^{−6} to 1×10^{−10}	10^{−8} to 10^{−12}	10 to 100,000 km	10^{8} to 10^{4}
Dense nebula				10,000
Interplanetary space				11
Interstellar space				1
Intergalactic space				10^{−6}

== See also ==
- Decay of the vacuum (Pair production)
- Engine vacuum
- False vacuum
- Helium mass spectrometer – technical instrumentation to detect a vacuum leak
- Vacuum brazing
- Pneumatic tube – transport system using vacuum or pressure to move containers in tubes
- Rarefaction – reduction of a medium's density
- Sous vide - a cooking technique which protects food using a vacuum
- Suction – creation of a partial vacuum
- Theta vacuum – vacuum state of semi-classical pure-Yang Mills theories
- Vactrain
- Vacuum cementing – natural process of solidifying homogeneous "dust" in vacuum
- Vacuum column – controlling loose magnetic tape in early computer data recording tape drives
- Vacuum deposition – process of depositing atoms and molecules in a sub-atmospheric pressure environment
- Vacuum engineering
- Vacuum flange – joining of vacuum systems
