= Hubert Schardin =

German photographer and cinematographer (1902–1965)

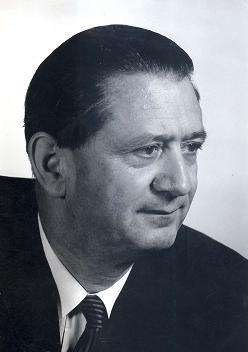
Hubert Schardin, 1963

Hubert Hermann Reinhold Schardin (17 June 1902 Plassow – 27 September 1965 in Freiburg im Breisgau) was a German ballistics expert, engineer and academic who studied in the field of high-speed photography and cinematography.

He also was the director of the German-French Research Institute (ISL) in Saint-Louis (France) and founder and director of the Fraunhofer Society Institute for High-Speed Dynamics - Ernst-Mach-Institut (EMI) - in Freiburg im Breisgau.

== Scientific importance ==
The main importance of Schardin's scientific activities is in high-speed physics. He extended the research of Ernst Mach and Fritz Ahlborn, resulting in more than 1,000 publications. He influenced the development of electro- and high-speed exposures, electro-optical photography and high-speed cinematography with illumination by electric spark and flash x-rays.

He developed high-speed measurement techniques, at first for the specific problems of ballistics, to a general scientific level of instrumentation. He also developed new application areas for these techniques. An important innovation by Schardin was the development of a High speed camera in 1929 with his PhD advisor Carl Cranz, the (Cranz-Schardin camera). This high-speed camera was important in scientific research for almost a century, and was only recently rendered obsolete by modern advances in high-speed electronic digital cameras.

Schardin also had significant impact on the development of shaped-charge explosives, which are now used by the military for armor-piercing weapons.

Since 1969, the International Congress for High-Speed Photography and Photonics ICHSPP (with the assistance of the Association for High-Speed Physics) has awarded the Hubert Schardin Medal in his honor.

== Life ==
Schardin attended high school in Slupsk, where he passed his final secondary-school examinations in 1922. He then studied physics at Technische Hochschule Berlin-Charlottenburg (today Technische Universität Berlin) where he took the diploma exam in Technical Physics in 1926.

From 1927 to 1929 Schardin worked as private assistant, and then from 1930 to 1935 as a permanent assistant to the famous German ballistics Professor Carl Cranz. In 1934 he earned his PhD with honors, delivering a dissertation on the Toepler Schlieren photography method under the guidance of Cranz. This and later publications on this topic made Schardin the 20th-century patriarch of Schlieren photography and Shadowgraph imaging.

From autumn 1935 to spring 1936, Schardin accompanied Cranz to China, where they established a ballistics institute in Nanking for the Chinese military. During his stay in China, Schardin received an appointment as head of the Institute for Technical Physics and Ballistics of the Technical College of the German Air Force (TAL) in Berlin-Gatow. He returned to Germany, where he focused his work on ballistic studies and solid mechanics, especially glass technology and the high-speed physics of glass fracture.

On 1 December 1937 he was appointed as an associate professor, and in 1942 as a full professor at Technische Hochschule Berlin, where he was active until 1945. At war's end, the Institute for Technical Physics and Ballistics in Gatow was transferred to Biberach an der Riß in Southern Germany.

== ISL Institute in Saint-Louis (France) ==
After World War II a competition began among the Allies to acquire the knowledge of German scientists and engineers. The Technical College of the German Air Force, presided over by Schardin, was a particular goal of France and the USA.

Schardin was invited by France to work with his team for the French government in the Alsatian town of Saint-Louis, near the West-German border. He was also offered positions in the United States of America, who made the mistake of not inviting his research team as well. Always loyal to his colleagues, Schardin chose to take the position in France. On 1 August 1945 he, along with 32 other German scientists, became French civil servants working in Saint-Louis. He continued to live in Germany though, residing in nearby Weil am Rhein.

Schardin, now Director of Science and Technology, continued his studies at the institute in Saint-Louis on high-speed physics and glass fracture. In the environment of military research, he also studied explosions and detonations. Beginning in 1954 he conducted research mainly in the field of civil defense against nuclear weapons and their blast effects. In 1954 Schardin signed the contract for taking over the Z4 computer to the ISL.

Together with the French General and Engineer Robert Cassagnou, Schardin upheld the Institute until it was converted in 1959 - after two years of negotiation - to the German-French Research Institut Saint-Louis (ISL) [4]. Long-time enemies France and Germany had now united for the common defense, an early step in the modern European renaissance.

== EMI Institute in Freiburg ==
After the establishment of the ISL, Schardin sought contact with the nearby German University in Freiburg im Breisgau. There he was appointed at the Albert-Ludwigs-University in 1947 as Honorary Professor of Technical Physics, and he founded the Department of Applied Physics. This department spun off in 1959 from direct association with the University, and it became the Ernst-Mach Institute (EMI) of the Fraunhofer Society.

After some initial restrictions imposed by the occupying powers after World War II, Schardin was soon able to pursue new research topics in the Department of Applied Physics, and after 1955 at EMI. He was awarded by the German Glass Technical Society's "Georg-Gehlhoff-Ring" in 1958 for his successful research on the physics of glass. He also received the DuPont Medal of the US Society of Motion Picture and Television Engineers. In 1960, a former quarry in the experimental zone near Efringen-Kirchen was converted to perform explosives and simulation studies led by Schardin.

In October 1964, Professor Schardin was appointed Head of Military Technology in the Ministry of Defense of the Federal Republic of Germany.

== Death ==
Hubert Schardin married Irma née Jacob in 1937, and they raised four daughters. He died on 27 September 1965 of a myocardial infarction. At his funeral on 3 October 1965 in Weil am Rhein, over 500 attendees paid Schardin their last respects. One of these was German Defense Minister Kai-Uwe von Hassel.
