= Maximilien Toepler =

German physicist known for advancing Schlieren photography

Maximilien August Topler (25 June 1870 – 14 March 1960) was a German physicist known for his work on electrostatics, sparks and Schlieren photography. His father was the physicist August Toepler.

Toepler's law (1906) states that the resistance of an electric arc at any time is inversely proportional to the charge which has flowed through the arc:

$$R(t)={\frac{k_T D} {\int_{0}^{t} I(t) \, dt}}$$

where I(t) is the current in the arc discharge at time t, and D is the gap between the electrodes. The parameter $k_T$ is a constant whose value is $4 \times 10^{-3} \, V \cdot s \cdot m^{-1}$.
