= Synthetic schlieren =

Process used to visualize fluid flow

A synthetic schlieren photograph showing the buoyant air plume emitted by a blow torch

Synthetic schlieren is a process that is used to visualize the flow of a fluid of variable refractive index. Named after the schlieren method of visualization, it consists of a digital camera or video camera pointing at the flow in question, with an illuminated target pattern behind. The method was first proposed in 1999.

Variations in refractive index cause the light from the target to refract as it passes through the fluid, which causes a distortion of the pattern in the image seen by the camera. Pattern matching algorithms can measure this distortion and calculate a qualitative density field of the flow.

The method of synthetic schlieren can be used to observe any flow which has variations in refractive index. Commonly these are caused by variations in concentration of a solute in an aqueous solution, or variations in the density of a compressible flow, caused by temperature or pressure variations. As with the optical schlieren method, the clearest results are obtained from flows which are largely two-dimensional.

== See also ==
- Background-oriented schlieren technique
- Schlieren
- Shadowgraph
