= Vacuum cementing =

Natural process of contact bonding between objects in a hard vacuum

Vacuum cementing or vacuum welding is the natural process of joining small objects in a hard vacuum. The most notable example is dust on the surface of the Moon.

In 2009 the European Space Agency published a peer-reviewed paper detailing why cold welding is a significant issue that spacecraft designers need to carefully consider. The paper also cites a documented example from 1991 with the Galileo spacecraft high-gain antenna.

One source of difficulty is that vacuum welding does not exclude relative motion between the surfaces that are to be joined. This allows the broadly defined notions of galling, fretting, sticking, stiction and adhesion to overlap in some instances. For example, it is possible for a joint to be the result of both vacuum welding and galling (and/or fretting and/or impact). Galling and vacuum welding, therefore, are not mutually exclusive.

== See also ==
- Corrosion in space – Corrosion of materials occurring in outer space
- Passivation – Physico-chemical processes contributing to protect a surface against oxidation
