= Laser schlieren deflectometry =

Technique to measure gas temperature

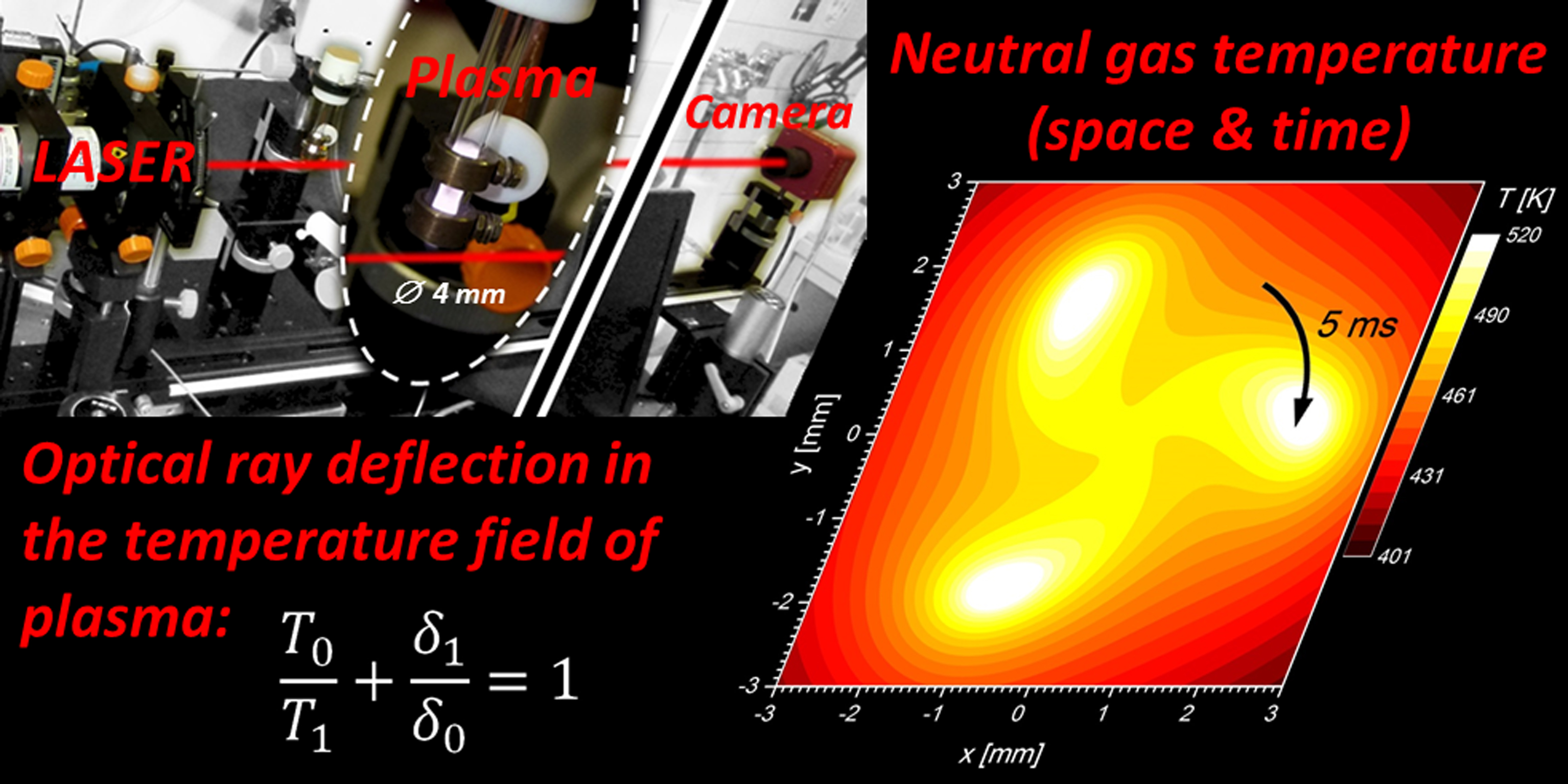
An experiment using Laser Schlieren Deflectometry (LSD) for temperature measurements in the argon plasma jet

Laser schlieren deflectometry (LSD) is a method for a high-speed measurement of the gas temperature in microscopic dimensions, in particular for temperature peaks under dynamic conditions at atmospheric pressure. The principle of LSD is derived from schlieren photography: a narrow laser beam is used to scan an area in a gas where changes in properties are associated with characteristic changes of refractive index. Laser schlieren deflectometry is claimed to overcome limitations of other methods regarding temporal and spatial resolution.

The theory of the method is analogous to the scattering experiment of Ernest Rutherford from 1911. However, instead of alpha particles scattered by gold atoms, here an optical ray is deflected by hot spots with unknown temperature. A general equation of LSD describes the dependence of the measured maximum deflection of the ray δ_{1} on the local maximum of the neutral gas temperature in the hot spot T_{1}:

$$\frac{T_0}{T_1} + \frac{\delta_1}{\delta_0} = 1,$$

where T_{0} is ambient temperature and δ_{0} is a calibration constant depending on the configuration of the experiment.

Laser schlieren deflectometry has been used for investigation of the temperature dynamics, heat transfer and energy balance in a miniaturized kind of atmospheric-pressure plasma.

== See also ==
- Moire deflectometry
- Schlieren
- Schlieren photography
- Shadowgraph
