= Cold welding =

Welding process in which joining occurs without melting or heating the interface

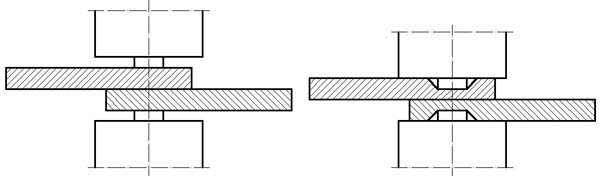
Cross-section of cold welding – before and after the weld

Cold welding or contact welding is a solid-state welding process in which joining takes place without fusion or heating at the interface of the two parts to be welded. Unlike in fusion welding, no liquid or molten phase is present in the joint.

Cold welding was first recognized as a general materials phenomenon in the 1940s. It was then discovered that two clean, flat surfaces of similar metal would strongly adhere if brought into contact while in a vacuum. Micro and nano-scale cold welding has shown potential in nanofabrication processes.

The reason for this unexpected behavior is that when the atoms in contact are all of the same kind, there is no way for the atoms to "know" that they are in different pieces of copper. When there are other atoms, in the oxides and greases and more complicated thin surface layers of contaminants in between, the atoms "know" when they are not on the same part.

— Richard Feynman, The Feynman Lectures on Physics, 12–5 Friction

Applications include wire stock and electrical connections (such as insulation-displacement connectors and wire wrap connections).

== In space ==
Mechanical problems in early satellites were sometimes attributed to cold welding.

In 2009 the European Space Agency published a peer reviewed paper detailing why cold welding is a significant issue that spacecraft designers need to carefully consider. The paper also cites a documented example from 1991 with the Galileo spacecraft high-gain antenna.

One source of difficulty is that cold welding does not exclude relative motion between the surfaces that are to be joined. This allows the broadly defined notions of galling, fretting, stiction and adhesion to overlap in some instances. For example, it is possible for a joint to be the result of both cold (or "vacuum") welding and galling (or fretting or impact). Galling and cold welding, therefore, are not mutually exclusive.

== Nanoscale ==
Unlike cold welding process at macro-scale which normally requires large applied pressures, scientists discovered that single-crystalline ultra-thin gold nanowires (diameters less than 10 nm) can be cold-welded together within seconds by mechanical contact alone, and under remarkably low applied pressures. High-resolution transmission electron microscopy and in-situ measurements reveal that the welds are nearly perfect, with the same crystal orientation, strength and electrical conductivity as the rest of the nanowire. The high quality of the welds is attributed to the nanoscale sample dimensions, oriented-attachment mechanisms and mechanically assisted fast surface diffusion. Nanoscale welds were also demonstrated between gold and silver, and silver and silver, indicating that the phenomenon may be generally applicable and therefore offer an atomistic view of the initial stages of macroscopic cold welding for either bulk metals or metallic thin film.

== See also ==
- Abutment (dentistry) – Connecting element in dentistry
- Gauge block wringing – System for producing precision lengths by stacking components
- Intermolecular force – Force of attraction or repulsion between molecules and neighboring particles
- Nanoimprint lithography – Method of fabricating nanometer scale patterns using a special stamp
- Optical contact bonding – Process whereby two closely conformal surfaces are held together by intermolecular forces
- Spot welding – Type of electric resistance welding
- Tribology – Science of rubbing surfaces
- Vacuum cementing – Natural process of contact bonding between objects in a hard vacuum
