= Galling =

Form of wear caused by adhesion between sliding surfaces

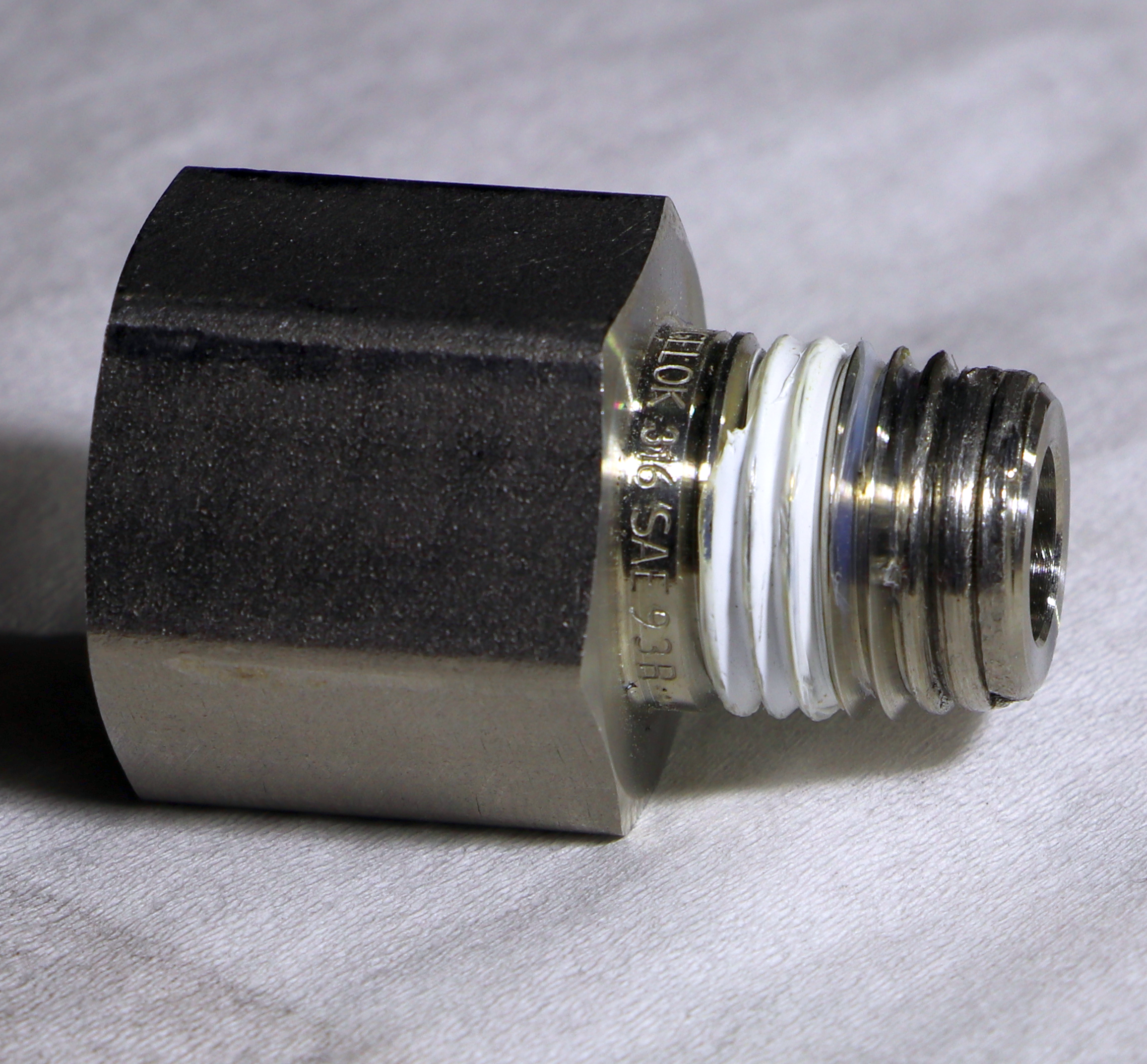
Galling on the threads not protected by PTFE tape on a NPT fitting (zoom in on first few threads for better view).

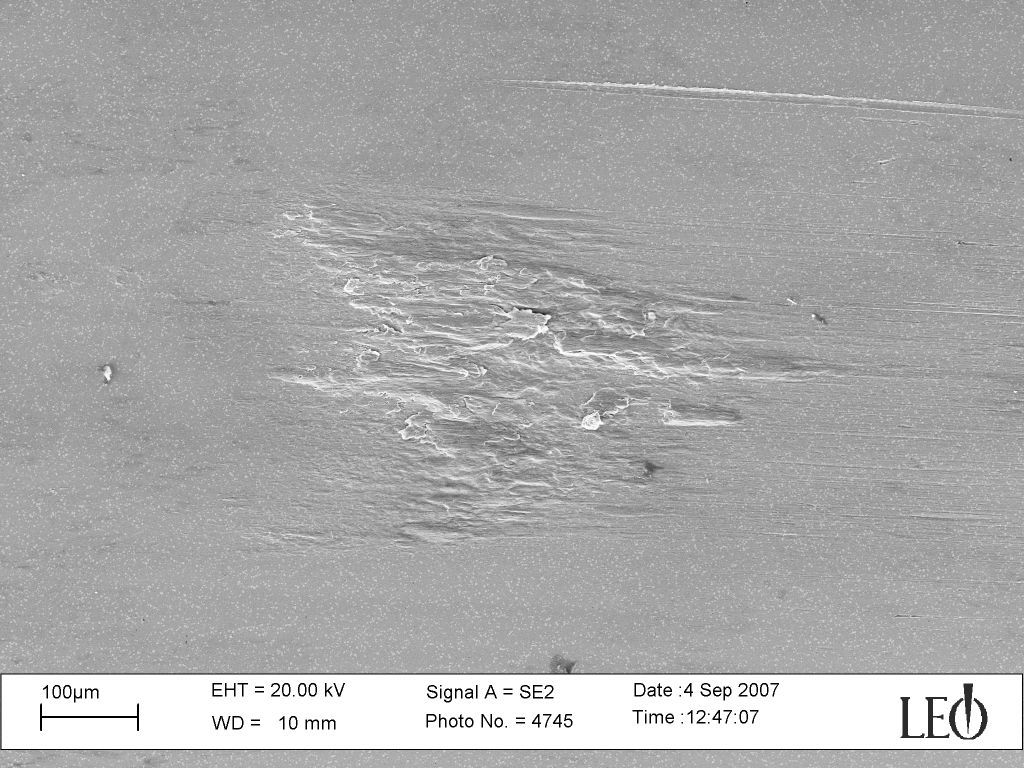
An electron microscope image shows transferred sheet-material accumulated on a tool surface during sliding contact under controlled laboratory conditions. The outgrowth of material or localized, roughening and creation of protrusions on the tool surface is commonly referred to as a lump.

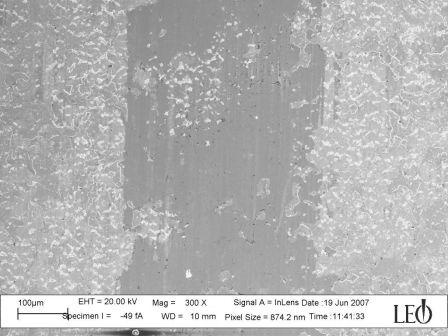
The damage on the metal sheet, wear mode, or characteristic pattern shows no breakthrough of the oxide surface layer, which indicates a small amount of adhesive material transfer and flattening damage of the sheet's surface. This is the first stage of material transfer and galling build-up.

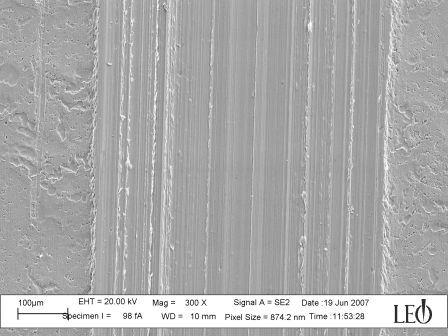
The damage on the metal sheet illustrates continuous lines or stripes, indicating a breakthrough of the oxide surface-layer.

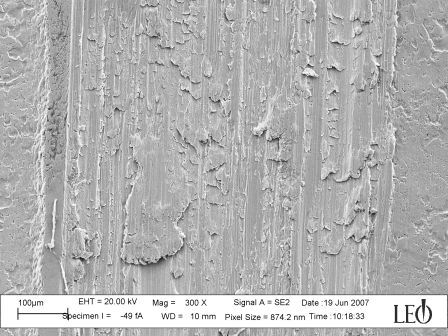
The damage on the metal sheet or characteristic pattern illustrates an "uneven surface," a change in the sheet material's plastic behavior and involves a larger deformed volume compared to mere flattening of the surface oxides.

Galling is a form of wear caused by adhesion between sliding surfaces. When a material galls, some of it is pulled with the contacting surface, especially if there is a large amount of force compressing the surfaces together. Galling is caused by a combination of friction and adhesion between the surfaces, followed by slipping and tearing of crystal structure beneath the surface. This will generally leave some material stuck or even friction welded to the adjacent surface, whereas the galled material will appear worn, chipped, or even gouged and may have balled-up or torn lumps of material stuck to its surface.

Galling is most commonly found in metal surfaces that are in sliding contact with each other. It is especially common where there is inadequate lubrication between the surfaces. However, certain metals will generally be more prone to galling, due to the atomic structure of their crystals. For example, aluminium will gall very easily, whereas annealed (softened) steel is slightly more resistant to galling. Steel that is fully hardened is very resistant to galling.

Galling is a common problem in most applications where metals slide in contact with other metals. This can happen regardless of whether the metals are the same or different. Alloys such as brass and bronze are often chosen for bearings, bushings, and other sliding applications because of their resistance to galling as well as other forms of mechanical abrasion.

== Introduction ==
Galling is adhesive wear that is caused by the microscopic transfer of material between metallic surfaces during transverse motion (sliding). It occurs frequently whenever metal surfaces are in contact, sliding against each other, especially with poor lubrication. It often occurs in high-load, low-speed applications, although it also can occur in high-speed applications with very little load. Galling is a common problem in sheet metal forming, bearings and pistons in engines, hydraulic cylinders, air motors, and many other industrial operations.

Galling is distinct from gouging and scratching, in that it involves the visible transfer of material as it is adhesively pulled (mechanically spalled) from one surface and deposited upon the other, in the form of a raised gall (lump). Unlike other forms of wear, galling is not usually a gradual process; it both occurs quickly and spreads rapidly, as the galled material becomes more effective at inducing further galling.

Galling can often occur in screws and bolts, causing the threads to seize and tear free from the fastener or the hole. In extreme cases, the bolt may seize without stripping the threads, which can lead to breakage of the fastener, the tool, or both. Threaded inserts of hardened steel are often used in metals like aluminium or stainless steel that can gall easily.

The process requires two properties common to most metals: cohesion through metallic-bonding attractions, and plasticity (the ability to deform without breaking). The tendency of a material to gall is affected by the ductility of the material. Typically, hardened materials are more resistant to galling, whereas softer materials of the same type will gall more readily. The propensity of a material to gall is also affected by the specific arrangement of the atoms, because crystals arranged in a face-centered cubic (FCC) lattice will usually allow material transfer to a greater degree than a body-centered cubic (BCC). This is because a face-centered cubic has a greater tendency to produce dislocations in the crystal lattice, which are defects that allow the lattice to shift, or "cross-slip," thereby making the metal more prone to galling. However, if the metal has a high number of stacking faults (a difference in stacking sequence between atomic planes), it will be less apt to cross-slip at the dislocations.

Thus, a material's resistance to galling is primarily determined by its stacking-fault energy: a material with high stacking-fault energy, such as aluminium or titanium, will be far more susceptible to galling than will a material with low stacking-fault energy, such as copper, bronze, or gold. Conversely, materials with a hexagonal close-packed (HCP) structure and a high c/a ratio—e.g., cobalt-based alloys—are extremely resistant to galling.

Galling occurs initially with material transfer of individual grains on a microscopic scale, which become stuck or even diffusion-welded to the adjacent surface. This transfer can be enhanced if one or both metals form a thin layer of hard oxides with high coefficients of friction, such as those found on aluminum or stainless steel. As the lump of transferred material grows, it pushes against the adjacent surface, forcing them apart and concentrating most of the frictional heat into a very small area; this, in turn, causes yet more adhesion and material build-up. The localized heat increases the plasticity of the galled surface, deforming the metal until the lump breaks through the surface and begins plowing up still larger amounts of material from the galled surface.

Methods of preventing galling include the use of lubricants like grease and oil, low-friction coatings and thin-film deposits like molybdenum disulfide or titanium nitride, and increasing the surface hardness of the metals using processes such as case hardening and induction hardening.

== Mechanism ==
In engineering science and other technical fields, the term "galling" is widespread. Due to problems with previous, mutually incompatible definitions and test-methods, ASTM International has formulated a common technical definition for the galling phenomenon, on the basis of both better means of measurement and a greater understanding of the frictional mechanisms involved; from the ASTM G40 standard: "Galling is a form of surface damage arising between sliding solids, distinguished by microscopic, usually localized, roughening and creation of protrusions (e.g., lumps) above the original surface."

When two metallic surfaces are pressed against each other, the initial interactions and the mating points are at the asperities—high points—found on each surface. An asperity may penetrate the opposing surface if there is a converging contact and relative movement. The contact between the surfaces initiates friction or plastic deformation, and induces pressure and energy, in a small area called the contact zone. The elevation in pressure increases the energy density and heat level within the deformed area. This leads to greater adhesion between the surfaces, which initiates material transfer, galling build-up, lump growth, and creation of protrusions above the original surface.

If the lump (i.e., protrusion of transferred material to one surface) grows to a height of several micrometers, it may penetrate the opposing surface oxide-layer and cause damage to the underlying material. Damage in the bulk material is a prerequisite for plastic flow in the deformed volume surrounding the lump. The geometry and speed of the lump define how the flowing material will be transported, accelerated, and decelerated around the lump; this material flow is critical when defining the contact pressure, energy density, and developed temperature during sliding. The mathematical function describing the acceleration and deceleration of flowing material is hence defined by these geometrical constraints, as determined from the lump's surface contour.

If the right conditions are met, an accumulation of energy can cause a clear change in a material's contact and plastic behavior, increasing the friction force required for adhesion and further movement. During sliding, the small real contact-area at asperity junctions results in high thermal contact resistance, thus yielding low heat-conductivity; meanwhile, sliding performs mechanical work upon the junction, which is—normally—dissipated largely as heat. The low interfacial heat outflow, and the continuous frictional energy input, together result in the progressive increase of energy density and temperature in the contact-zone.

The process can be compared to that of cold welding or friction welding: cold welding is not truly cold, as the fusing points exhibit an increase in temperature and energy density—derived, similarly, from applied pressure and plastic deformation in the contact zone.

Recent experimental investigations have further confirmed that friction conditions during sheet metal forming significantly influence the evolution of surface topography and consequently affect adhesive wear behaviour. Strip-drawing tests performed on low-carbon DC03 steel sheets demonstrated that contact pressure, lubrication regime and deformation level may lead to measurable changes in surface roughness parameters and asperity flattening mechanisms, which are closely associated with variations in friction coefficient and the risk of surface damage during forming operations.

== Incidence and location ==
Galling is often found between metallic surfaces where direct contact and relative motion have occurred. Sheet metal forming, thread manufacturing, and other industrial operations may include moving parts, or contact surfaces made of stainless steel, aluminium, titanium, and other metals whose natural development of an external oxide layer through passivation increases their corrosion resistance but renders them particularly susceptible to galling.

In metalworking that involves cutting (primarily turning and milling), galling is often used to describe a wear phenomenon that occurs when cutting soft metal. The work material is transferred to the cutter and develops a "lump." The developed lump changes the contact behavior between the two surfaces, which usually increases adhesion, and resistance to further cutting, and, due to created vibrations, can be heard as a distinct sound.

Galling often occurs with aluminium compounds and is a common cause of tool breakdown. Aluminium is a ductile metal, which means it possesses the ability for plastic flow with relative ease, presupposing a relatively consistent and significant plastic zone.

High ductility and flowing material can be considered a general prerequisite for excessive material transfer and galling because frictional heating is closely linked to the structure of plastic zones around penetrating objects.

Galling can occur even at relatively low loads and velocities because it is the real energy density in the system that induces a phase transition, which often leads to an increase in material transfer and higher friction.

Recent tribological studies have shown that surface topography parameters play an important role in the transition from stable sliding friction to adhesive damage and galling during sheet metal forming processes. Experimental strip-drawing tests combined with machine learning approaches such as Kohonen self-organising maps have been used to classify variations in the coefficient of friction and to identify surface conditions associated with an increased risk of adhesive wear and material transfer.

== Prevention ==
Generally, two major frictional systems affect adhesive wear or galling: solid surface contact and lubricated contact. In terms of prevention, they work in dissimilar ways and set different demands on the surface structure, alloys, and crystal matrix used in the materials.

In solid surface contact or unlubricated conditions, the initial contact is characterized by the interaction between asperities and the exhibition of two different sorts of attraction: cohesive surface-energy or the molecules connect and adhere the two surfaces together, notably even if a measurable distance separates them. Direct contact and plastic deformation generate another type of attraction through the constitution of a plastic zone with flowing material where induced energy, pressure, and temperature allow bonding between the surfaces on a much larger scale than cohesive surface energy.

In metallic compounds and sheet metal forming, the asperities are usually oxides, and the plastic deformation primarily consists of brittle fracture, which presupposes a very small plastic zone. The accumulation of energy and temperature is low due to the discontinuity in the fracture mechanism. However, during the initial asperity/asperity contact, wear debris or bits and pieces from the asperities adhere to the opposing surface, creating microscopic, usually localized, roughening and creation of protrusions (in effect lumps) above the original surface. The transferred wear debris and lumps penetrate the opposing oxide surface layer and cause damage to the underlying bulk material, plowing it forward. This allows continuous plastic deformation, plastic flow, and accumulation of energy and temperature. The prevention of adhesive material transfer is accomplished by the following or similar approaches:

- Low-temperature carburizing treatments such as Kolsterising can eliminate galling in austenitic stainless steels by increasing surface hardness up to 1200 HV0.05 (depending on the base material and surface conditions).
- Less cohesive or chemical attraction between surface atoms or molecules.
- Avoid continuous plastic deformation and plastic flow, for example, through a thicker oxide layer on the subject material in sheet-metal forming (SMF).
- Coatings deposited on the SMF work tool, such as chemical vapor deposition (CVD) or physical vapor deposition (PVD) and titanium nitride (TiN) or diamond-like carbon coatings exhibit low chemical reactivity even in high energy frictional contact, where the subject material's protective oxide layer is breached, and the frictional contact is distinguished by continuous plastic deformation and plastic flow.

Lubricated contact places other demands on the surface structure of the materials involved, and the main issue is to retain the protective lubrication thickness and avoid plastic deformation. This is important because plastic deformation raises the temperature of the oil or lubrication fluid and changes the viscosity. Any eventual material transfer or creation of protrusions above the original surface will also reduce the ability to retain a protective lubrication thickness. A proper protective lubrication thickness can be assisted or retained by:

- Surface cavities or small holes can create a favorable geometric situation for the oil to retain a protective lubrication thickness in the contact zone.
- Cohesive forces on the surface can increase the chemical attraction between the surface and lubricants and enhance the lubrication thickness.
- Oil additives may reduce the tendency for galling or adhesive wear.

== See also ==
- Tribology – Science of rubbing surfaces
- Rheology – Study of the flow of matter, primarily in a fluid state
- Surface engineering – Altering the properties of solid surfaces
- Pin on disc tribometer – Instrument that measures friction and wear between surfaces
