= Toepler pump =

Mercury piston pump

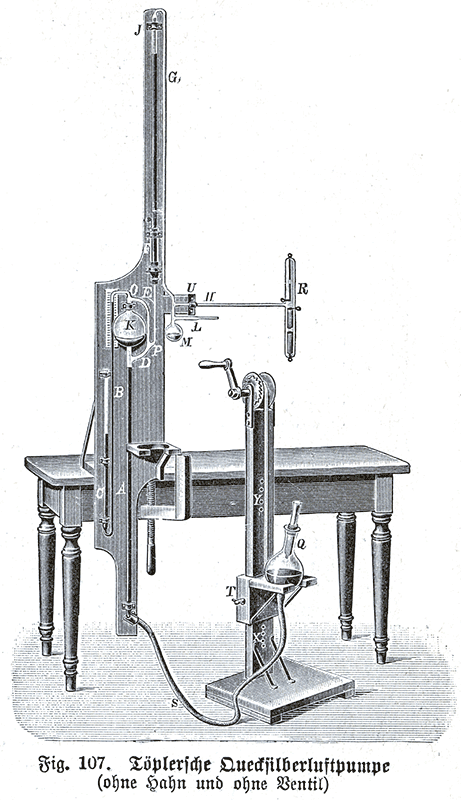
Toepler Pump diagram

A Toepler pump is a form of mercury piston pump, invented by August Toepler in 1850.

== Operation ==
The principle is illustrated in the diagram. When reservoir G is lowered, bulb B and tube T are filled with gas from the enclosure being evacuated (through tube A). When G is raised, mercury rises in tube F and cuts off the gas in B and T at C. This gas is then forced through the mercury in tube D into the atmosphere. The end of tube D is bent upward at E to facilitate collection of gas (or vapor). By alternately raising G, a pumping action results. Clearly tubes F and D must be long enough to support mercury columns corresponding to atmospheric pressure (76 cm at sea level). Instead of using mercury to provide a valving action at C, it is possible to use a glass float valve.
