= Schlieren photography =

Process to photograph fluid flow

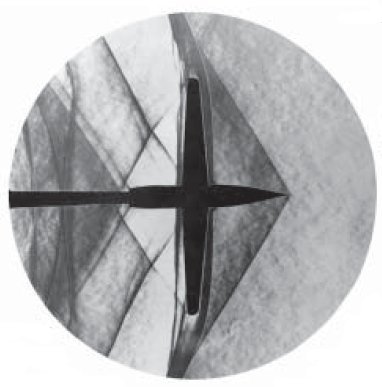
A schlieren photograph showing the compression in front of an unswept wing at Mach 1.2

Schlieren image of a shotshell projectile exiting a barrel

Schlieren photography is a process for photographing optical inhomogeneities in transparent media that are not necessarily visible to the human eye, typically used to study fluid flow, like the flow of air around objects in aeronautical engineering. The conventional schlieren imaging system was developed in 1864 by the German physicist August Toepler to detect schlieren (striae, streaks) in optical glass.

The process works by imaging the deflections of light rays that are refracted by a moving fluid, allowing normally unobservable changes in a fluid's refractive index to be seen. Because changes to flow rate directly affect the refractive index of a fluid, one can therefore photograph a fluid's flow rate (as well as other changes to density, temperature, and pressure) by viewing changes to its refractive index.

Using the schlieren photography process, other unobservable fluid changes can also be seen, such as convection currents, and the standing waves used in acoustic levitation.

== Classical optical system ==
The classical implementation of an optical schlieren system uses light from a single collimated source shining on, or from behind, a target object. Variations in refractive index caused by density gradients in the fluid distort the collimated light beam. This distortion creates a spatial variation in the intensity of the light, which can be visualised directly with a shadowgraph system.

Optical layout of a single-mirror schlieren system

Classical schlieren imaging systems appear in two configurations, using either one or two mirrors. In each case, a transparent object is illuminated with collimated or nearly-collimated light. Rays that are not deflected by the object proceed to their focal point, where they are blocked by a knife edge. Rays that are deflected by the object, have a chance of passing the knife edge without being blocked. As a result, one can place a camera after the knife edge such that the image of the object will exhibit intensity variations due to the deflections of the rays. The result is a set of lighter and darker patches corresponding to positive and negative fluid density gradients in the direction normal to the knife edge. When a knife edge is used, the system is generally referred to as a schlieren system, which measures the first derivative of density in the direction of the knife edge. If a knife edge is not used, the system is generally referred to as a shadowgraph system, which measures the second derivative of density.

In the two-mirror schlieren system (sometimes called the Z-configuration), the source is collimated by the first mirror, the collimated light traverses the object and then is focused by the second mirror. This generally allows higher resolution imaging (seeing finer details in the object) than is possible using the single-mirror configuration.

Schlieren system designs

Optical layout of a two-mirror schlieren system, showing only the undeviated rays

Optical layout of a two-mirror schlieren system, showing the deviated rays imaged at the camera's detector

If the fluid flow is uniform, the image will be steady, but any turbulence will cause scintillation, the shimmering effect that can be seen over heated surfaces on a hot day. To visualise instantaneous density profiles, a short-duration flash (rather than continuous illumination) may be used.

== Focusing schlieren optical system ==
In the mid 20th century, R. A. Burton developed an alternative form of schlieren photography, which is now usually called focusing schlieren or lens-and-grid schlieren, based on a suggestion by Hubert Schardin. Focusing schlieren systems generally retain the characteristic knife edge to produce contrast, but instead of using collimated light and a single knife edge, they use an illumination pattern of repeated edges with a focusing imaging system.

Basic diagram of a focusing schlieren system

The basic idea is that the illumination pattern is imaged onto a geometrically congruent cutoff pattern (essentially a multiplicity of knife edges) with focusing optics, while density gradients lying between the illumination pattern and the cutoff pattern are imaged, typically by a camera system. Like in classical schlieren, the distortions produce regions of brightening or darkening corresponding to the position and direction of the distortion, because they redirect rays either away from or onto the opaque part of the cutoff pattern. While in classical schlieren, distortions over the whole beam path are visualized equally, in focusing schlieren, only distortions in the object field of the camera are clearly imaged. Distortions away from the object field become blurred, so this technique allows some degree of depth selection. It also has the advantage that a wide variety of illuminated backgrounds can be used, since collimation is not required. This allows construction of projection-based focusing schlieren systems, which are much easier to build and align than classical schlieren systems. The requirement of collimated light in classical schlieren is often a substantial practical barrier for constructing large systems due to the need for the collimating optic to be the same size as the field of view. Focusing schlieren systems can use compact optics with a large background illumination pattern, which is particularly easy to produce with a projection system. For systems with large demagnification, the illumination pattern needs to be around twice larger than the field of view to allow defocusing of the background pattern.

Recently, there has been a reemergence of focusing schlieren due to the development of self-aligning methods. Traditionally, alignment of the focusing schlieren methods has kept them prohibitively hard to use.

== Background-oriented techniques ==
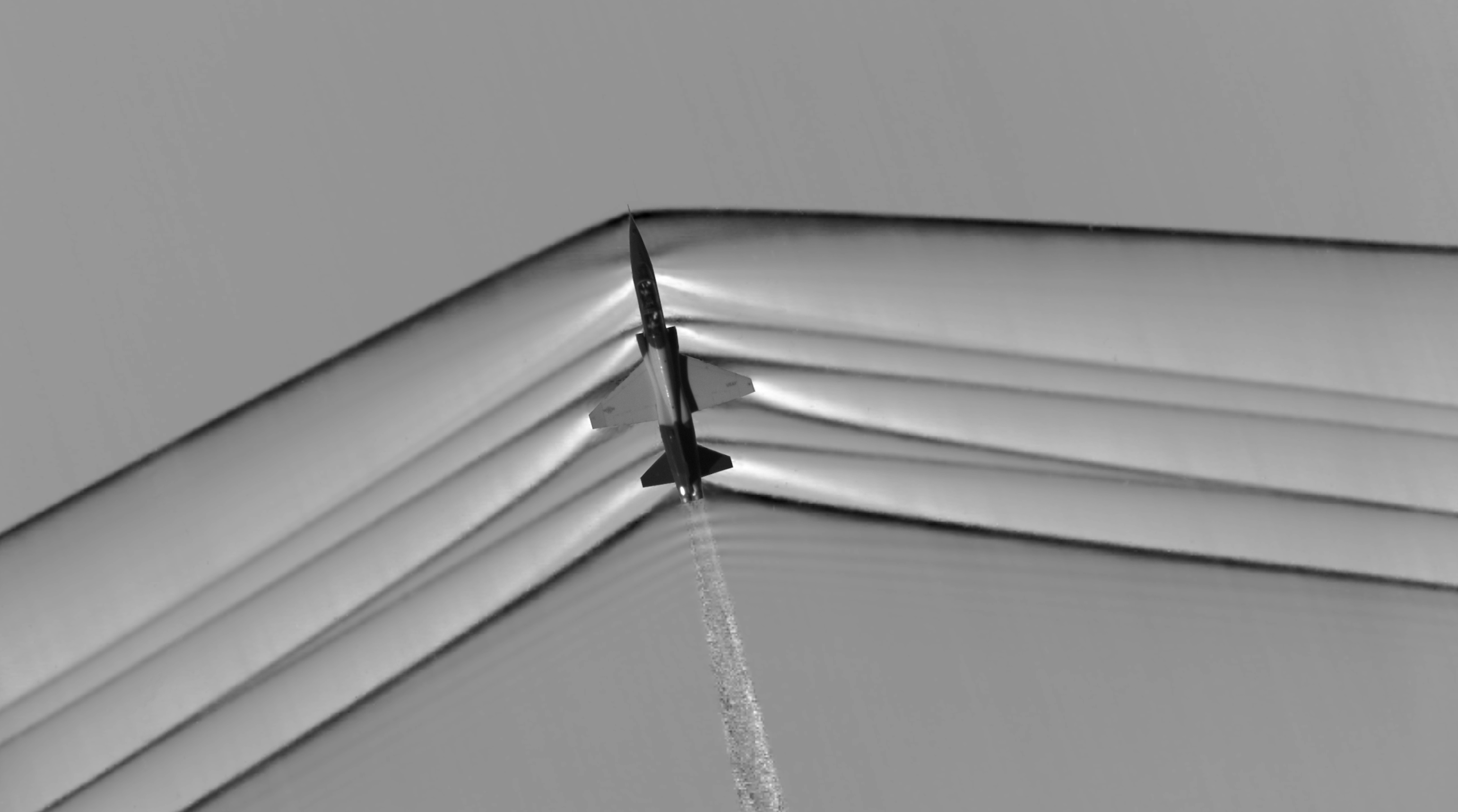
Shock waves produced by a T-38 Talon during flight using background-oriented schlieren

Background-oriented schlieren technique (BOS) has initially been developed at the German Aerospace Center (DLR). It relies on measuring or visualizing shifts in focused images. In these techniques, the background and the schlieren object (the distortion to be visualized) are both in focus and the distortion is detected because it moves part of the background image relative to its original position. Because of this focus requirement, they tend to be used for large-scale applications where both the schlieren object and the background are distant (typically beyond the hyperfocal distance of the optical system). Since these systems require no additional optics aside from a camera, they are often the simplest to construct but they are usually not as sensitive as other types of schlieren systems, with the sensitivity being limited by the camera resolution. The technique also requires a suitable background image. In some cases, the background may be provided by the experimenter, such as a random speckle pattern or sharp line, but naturally occurring features such as landscapes or bright light sources such as the sun and moon can also be used. Background-oriented schlieren is most often performed using software techniques such as digital image correlation and optical flow analysis to perform synthetic schlieren, but it is possible to achieve the same effect in streak imaging with an analog optical system.

Optical flow algorithms can be used to process BOS data as they provide high accuracy .

== Variations and applications ==
Variations on the optical schlieren method include the replacement of the knife-edge by a coloured target, resulting in rainbow schlieren which can assist in visualising the flow. Different edge configurations such as concentric rings can also give sensitivity to variable gradient directions, and programmable digital edge generation has been demonstrated as well using digital displays and modulators. The adaptive optics pyramid wavefront sensor is a modified form of schlieren (having two perpendicular knife edges formed by the vertices of a refracting square pyramid).

Complete schlieren optical systems can be built from components, or bought as commercially available instruments. Details of theory and operation are given in Settles' 2001 book. The USSR once produced a number of sophisticated schlieren systems based on the Maksutov telescope principle, many of which still survive in the former Soviet Union and China.

Schlieren photography is used to visualise the flows of the media, which are themselves transparent (hence, their movement cannot be seen directly), but form refractive index gradients, which become visible in schlieren images either as shades of grey or even in colour. Refractive index gradients can be caused either by changes of temperature/pressure of the same fluid or by the variations of the concentration of components in mixtures and solutions. A typical application in gas dynamics is the study of shock waves in ballistics and supersonic or hypersonic vehicles. Flows caused by heating, physical absorption or chemical reactions can be visualised. Thus schlieren photography can be used in many engineering problems such as heat transfer, leak detection, study of boundary layer detachment, and characterization of optics.

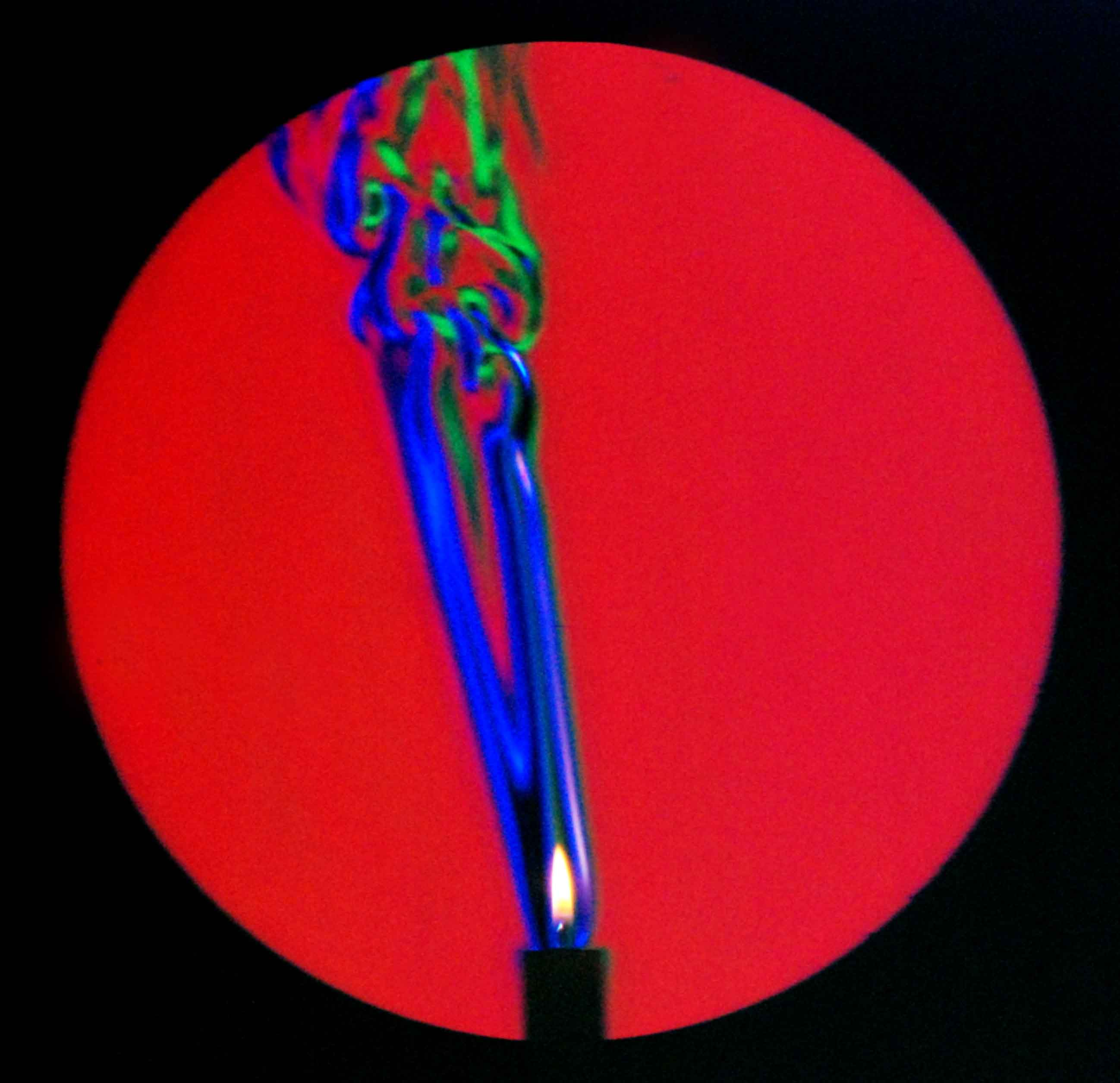
Schlieren image of the thermal plume from a burning candle, disturbed by a breeze from the right

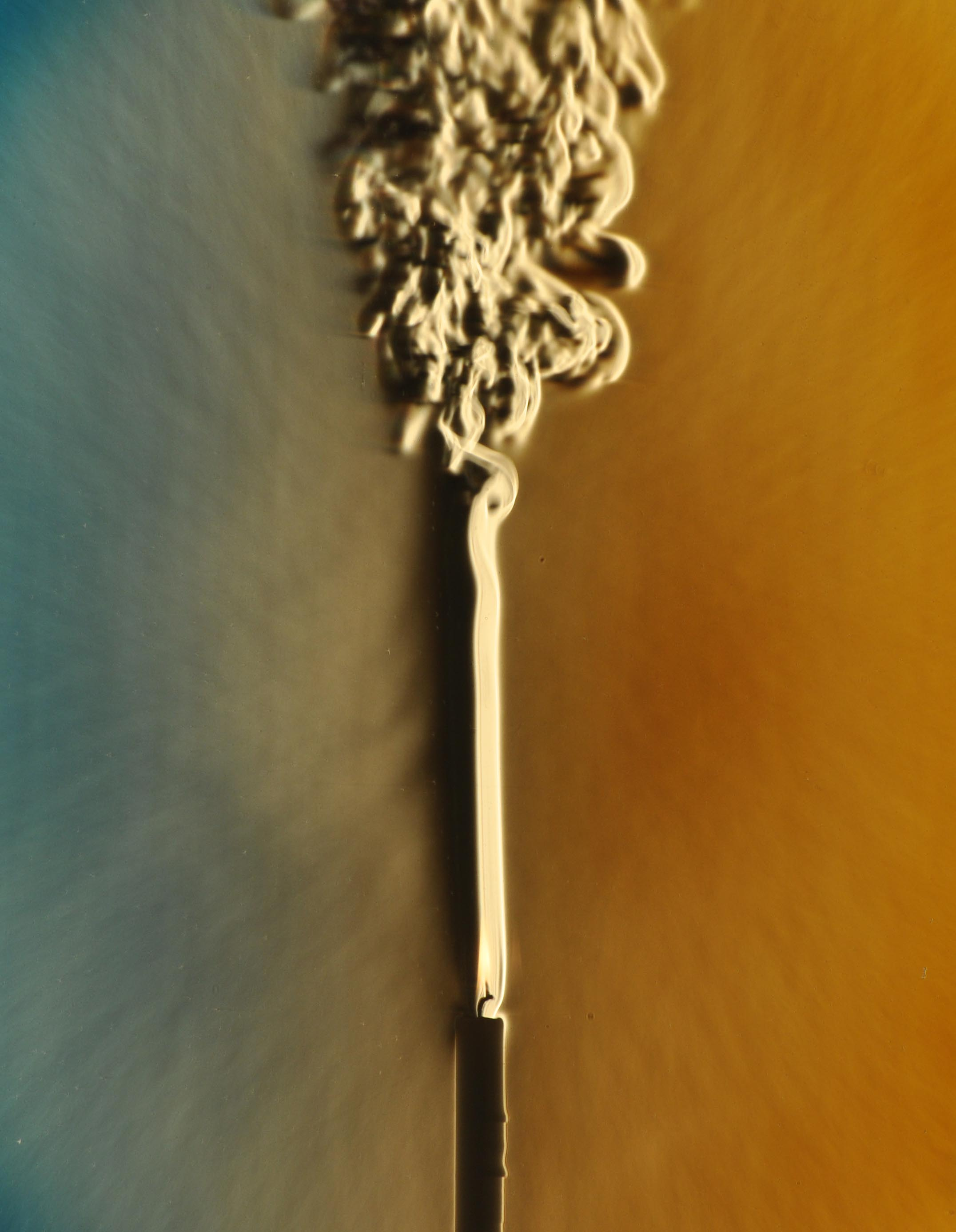
Schlieren image showing the thermal convection plume rising from an ordinary candle in still air. This photograph clearly shows the transition from laminar to turbulent flow.

== See also ==
- Laser schlieren deflectometry
- Mach–Zehnder interferometer
- Moire deflectometry
- Schlieren
- Schlieren imaging
- Shadowgraph
