= Moiré deflectometry =

Optics concept

Moiré deflectometry produces result that appears similar to an interferometry technique, in which the object to be tested (either phase object or specular surface) is mounted in the course of a collimated beam followed by a pair of transmission gratings placed at a distance from each other. The resulting fringe pattern, i.e., the moiré deflectogram, is a map of ray deflections corresponding to the optical properties of the inspected object.

Moiré deflectometry can be a powerful tool for nondestructive optical testing. A major advantage of the technique is that it is less sensitive to mechanical vibration, and it is therefore widely used in the ophthalmic industry for laminar analysis. A similar implementation in wind tunnel application for quantitative measurement is moire schlieren, a variation of schlieren photography.

In 2012 the first application of the method for the measurement of electron density in plasma has been published. The method excels in spatial and temporal resolution comparably with a similar approach of laser schlieren deflectometry.
