= August Toepler =

German chemist and physicist (1836–1912)

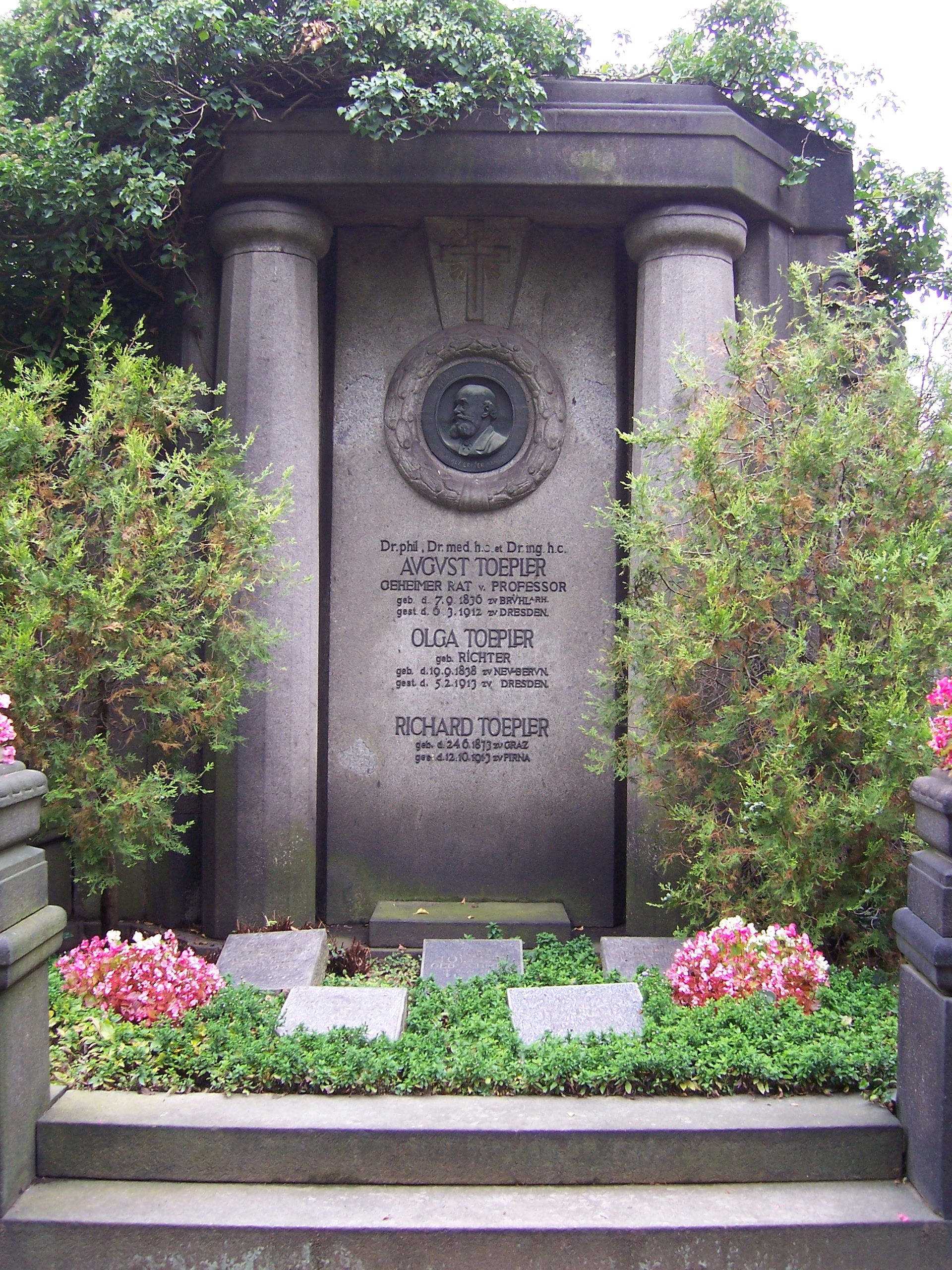
- August Toepler's grave at Johannisfriedhof
- Born: August Joseph Ignaz Toepler; 7 September 1836; Brühl bei Bonn, Germany
- Died: 6 March 1912 (aged 75); Dresden, Saxony, Germany
- Education: University of Jena
- Occupation: Physicist
- Known for: Toepler pump Toepler–Holtz machine Schlieren photography
- Scientific career
- Fields: Electrostatics
- Workplaces: Dresden University of Technology; Riga Technical University; University of Graz

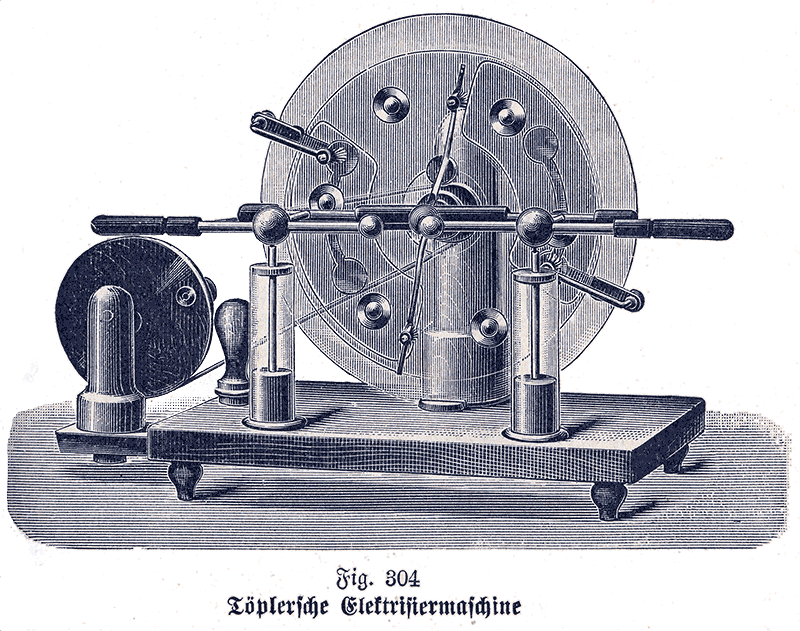
Toepler electrostatic generator.

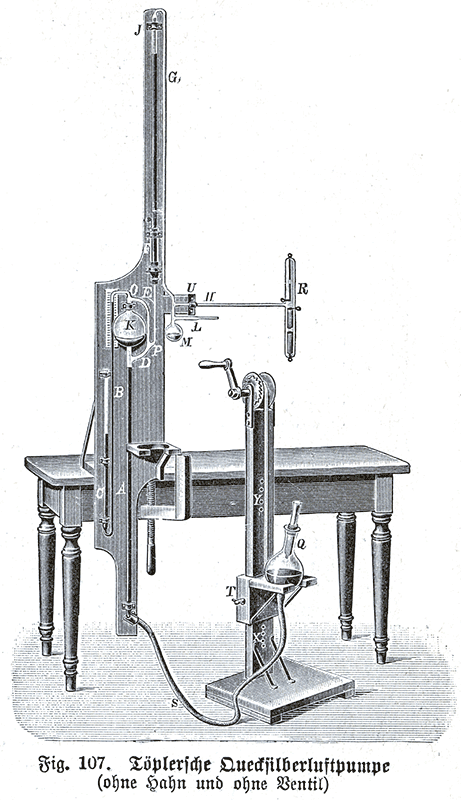
Toepler mercury air pump.

August Joseph Ignaz Toepler (7 September 1836 – 6 March 1912) was a German chemist and physicist known for his experiments in electrostatics.

== Biography ==
August Toepler was born on 7 September 1836. He studied chemistry at the Gewerbe-Institut Berlin (1855–1858) and graduated from the University of Jena in 1860. Later Toepler turned to experimental physics. August Toepler was a lecturer of chemistry and physics at the Academy Poppelsdorf (1859-1864). He received a chair of chemistry and chemical technology at the Polytechnic Institute of Riga and he hold this position between 1864 and 1868.

In 1864, he applied Foucault's knife-edge test for telescope mirrors to the analysis of fluid flow and the shock wave. He named this new method schlieren photography, for which he is justifiably famous. He also developed the Toepler machine, an electrostatic influence machine (high voltage generator) in 1865, which would one day find use in early medical x-ray machines. Improved versions were produced by Wilhelm Holtz, Roger and J. Robert Voss.

In 1868, he became a professor at the University of Graz in Austria, where under his administration a new physical institute has appeared. In 1876, Toepler came to Dresden where he was offered the chair of Experimental Physics. He was a director of the Physical Institute at the Dresden Technical University till his retirement in 1900. His son Maximilian Toepler continued the scientific work independently. Toepler is remembered as an inventor of electrostatic machines, and for his work with air pumps and acoustic waves.

Toepler described also a symmetrical machine (1866) that is a sectorless machine and a similar device is used as a voltage multiplier.

Toepler’s electrostatic machines were made by different people and companies, e.g. a Toepler machine can be found in a Welch Scientific Company (Chicago, USA) catalog. The differences between a Toepler machine, a Holtz machine, and a Toepler-Holtz machine are unclear even in books written when they were vital, modern technology. Sometimes such a machine is called a Holtz-Toepler machine simply because it was made by Holtz, but the original design is still the same as the Toepler machine.

This model of an electrostatic induction generator, very much in vogue for electromedical purposes towards the end of the nineteenth century, is based on the principles of electrophorus and duplicator function. It is derived from the mechanical improvements made between 1865 and 1880 by the physicist August Topler, the German physicist Wilhelm Holtz (1836-1913) and by J. Robert Voss, a mechanician from Berlin. Voss devised this self-excitation model in 1880, perfecting a machine presented by Topler the previous year.

The machine rests upon a footed walnut base. A column horizontally supports the axis of rotation. Two thin, shellacked, parallel glass disks in close proximity one to the other are vertically hinged to this axis. The larger of the two (the rear one), is a fixed disk and rests on the base along the groove of an ebonite insulation disk; the other (the front one), is a smaller mobile disk and rotates by means of a crank that controls a pair of pulleys connected by a cord. On its outer side, the fixed disk carries the inductors, two strips of tinfoil glued in the middle of two, broad paper shields placed diametrically, one beside the other.

The mobile disk carries the Toepler-Voss self-excitation system consisting of six metallic buttons, each surrounded by a ring of tinfoil, placed equidistantly in a circle. Two small metal brushes rub against the buttons; the brushes are fixed to a curved conductor (covered with ebonite) that is clamped to the disks at opposite points and is in contact with the inductor’s tinfoil strips. In front of the buttons, fixed to the edge of the mobile disk towards the horizontal diameter, two brass collection combs, each having 10 points, are positioned in the direction of the disk.

The combs are in contact with the inner shields of two Leiden jars, and with the arms of the spark-gap, two brass bars equipped with spherules and insulation handles, into which the sparks are released. The outer shields of the Leiden jars rest on two brass disks electrically connected by a metallic wire, which passes along the base.

A second pair of collection combs, facing the mobile disk, each with eight points and a central metal brush that rubs against the buttons, comprises the so-called “diametrical conductor”.

The “diametrical conductor” is inclined at 45° with respect to the horizontal diameter and allowed for the polarity of the linings to be maintained unaltered, especially when the exciting dynamos moved farther away than their normal explosive distance. Not even a weak initial charge is needed to start the machine; the self-excitation system automatically starts by turning the mobile disk clock-wise (when viewed from the front of the machine) using the special crank.

The quantity of charge captured through induction by the combs is collected by the two mobile, brass collection rings, the terminal spherules of the spark-gap are each charged by the opposite sign with respect to the sign of the comb with which they are in contact. In this manner the machine is able to produce sparks, at times very long ones, especially if the poles of the spark-gap are in contact with the internal shields of the two Leiden jars.

Standard direct current was not always available at the turn of the century so that Toepler-Holtz electrostatic generators were used to provide physicians with current for treatment as well as to power the first x-ray devices. They were fairly common and advertised in the Sears catalogue with numerous accessories. This machine built in an oak-and-glass cabinet is a Toepler-Holtz generator made by the Betz company of Chicago (ca. 1900). It was intended for medical use, and has an X-ray tube controller as an integral part.

This machine is of the Toepler-Holtz design and comes from the late 1890s. It was sold to practicing physicians as a potential source for the excitation of X-ray tubes. For this it works quite well, yielding about 1 mA at 80 kV at moderate rates of rotation. Accessories to be found in the drawers are for “electrical treatment” for such things as baldness, lameness, etc.

Most are systems of points designed to produce brush discharges. A low table with glass legs is included for electric isolation of the patient. Some of the devices look as though they are instruments of torture even without the application of electricity. The case enclosing the plates should not be opened except for repairs. The machine is operated by turning the crank counterclockwise as one looks at the front. A rotary switch at the center connects or disconnects the Leyden jars to the terminals.

The pictured generator is one of the larger types and is made up of 24 glass plates, 6 sets of four each, which were rotated to produce current for therapy. It was made by an unknown maker (Wagner?), c. 1910.

August and Maximilian Toepler started research in the field of gas discharge physics at the Dresden University of Technology. This research particularly resulted in the development of the Schlieren technique. With the application of the “streak method” Toepler succeeded as the first scientist in making acoustic waves in the air visible. This method was found to be also important for the high-speed cinematography. Motion pictures have also been used to study phenomena that occur so fast that they cannot be recorded on normal cameras. An immense amount of ingenuity has been applied to the solution of many problems in this field.

== Schlieren optical system ==
The principal of Toepler's Schlieren photography, known as the Foucault knife-edge test, was originally developed as a sensitive test for lenses, mirrors, and other optical components by Léon Foucault in 1859. Toepler was the first to modify the principle for real time observation of liquid or gaseous flow and sound waves, where it continues to be widely used.

== Trivia ==
Toepler's son Maximilien Toepler was also a physicist, and worked independently in the same field.

Toepler was also famous for inventing the Toepler Pump as seen in the bottom right hand picture.
