= Space blanket =

Aluminized plastic sheet used to protect against heat in space

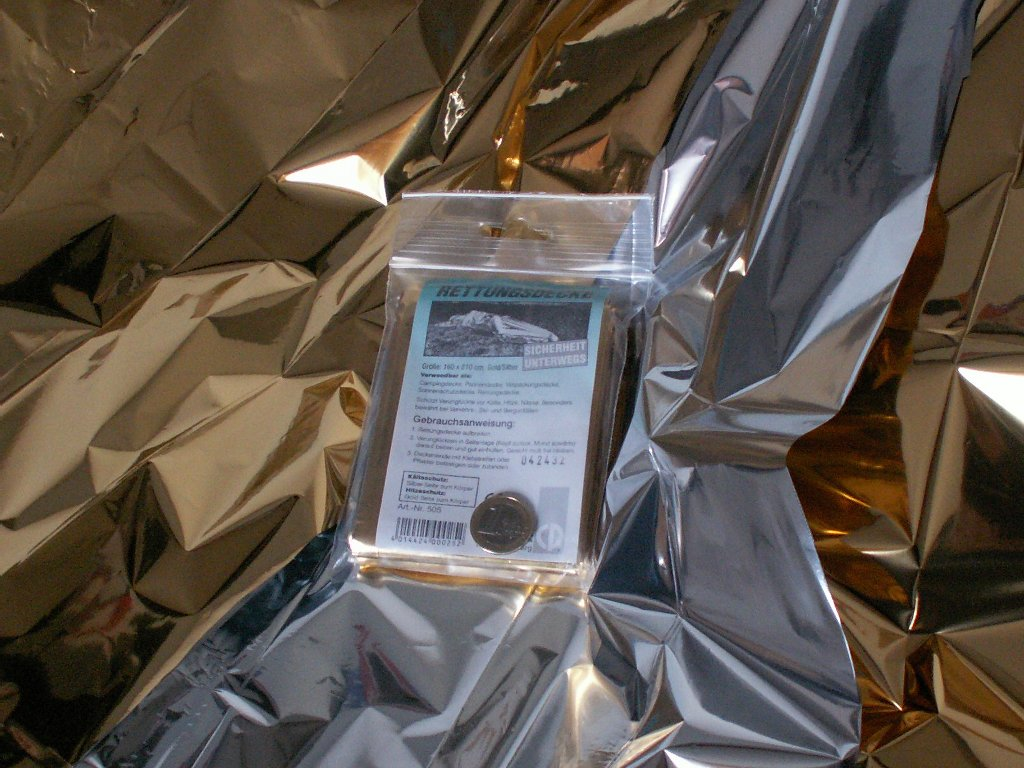
A space blanket

A space blanket is an especially low-weight, low-bulk blanket made of heat-reflective thin plastic sheeting. They are used on the exterior surfaces of spacecraft for thermal control, as well as by people. Their design reduces the heat loss in a person's body, which would otherwise occur quickly due to thermal radiation, water evaporation, or convection. Their low weight and compact size before unfurling make them ideal when space or weight are at a premium. They may be included in first aid kits and with camping equipment. Lost campers and hikers have an additional possible benefit: the shiny surface flashes in the sun, allowing its use as an improvised distress beacon for searchers and as a method of signalling over long distances to other people.

== Name ==
Space blankets are also known by the names of Mylar blanket, emergency blanket, first aid blanket, safety blanket, thermal blanket, weather blanket, heat sheet, foil blanket, or shock blanket.

== Manufacturing ==
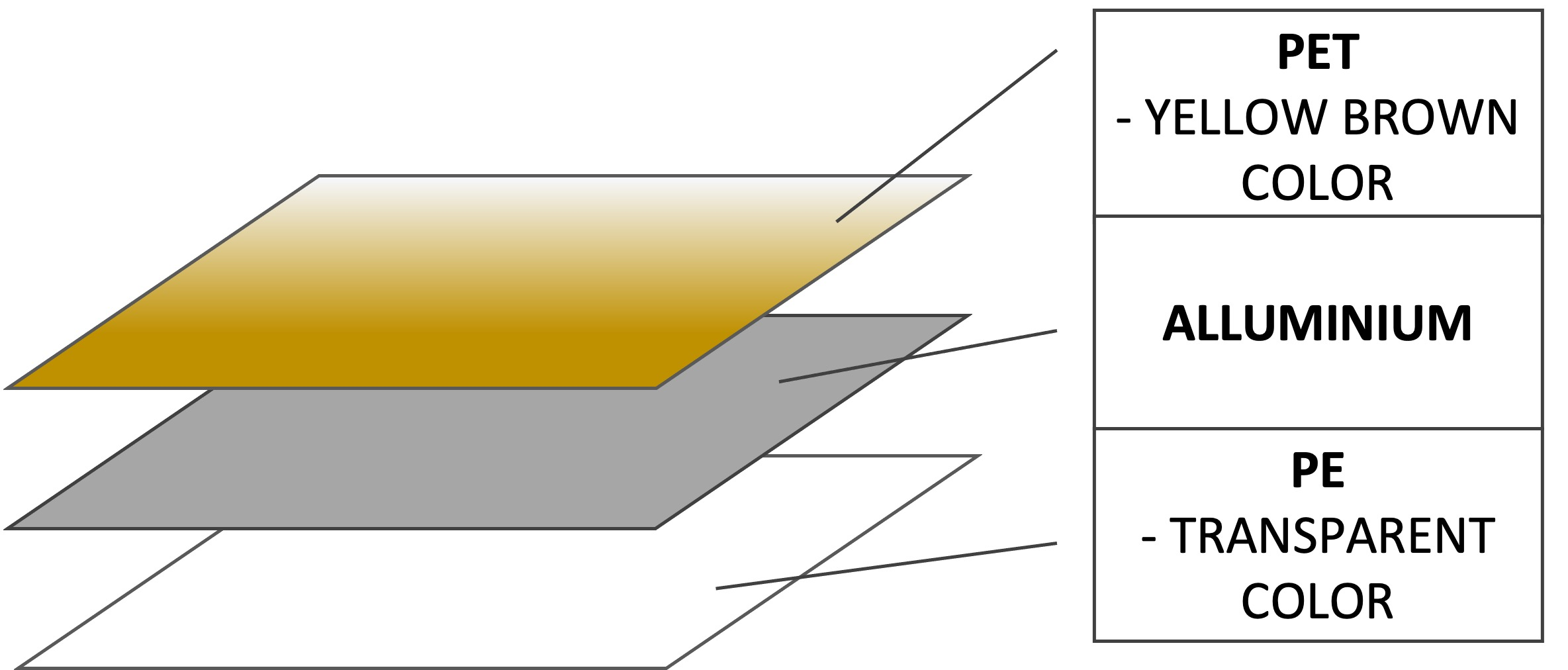
Layering materials of emergency blanket

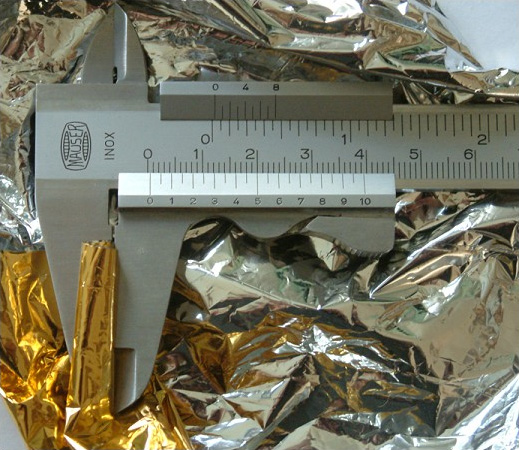
32 layers are 0.45mm thick

First developed by NASA's Marshall Space Flight Center in 1964 for the US space program, the material comprises a thin sheet of plastic (often PET film) that is coated with a metallic, reflecting agent, making it metallized polyethylene terephthalate (MPET) that is usually gold or silver in color, which reflects up to 97% of radiated heat.

For use in space, polyimide (e.g. Kapton, UPILEX) substrate is usually chosen due to its resistance to the hostile space environment, large temperature range (cryogenic to −260 °C and for short excursions over 480 °C), low outgassing (making it suitable for vacuum use), and resistance to ultraviolet radiation. Aluminized Kapton, with foil thickness of 50 and 125 μm, was used on the Apollo Lunar Module. The polyimide gives the foils their distinctive amber-gold color.

Space blankets are made by vacuum-depositing a very precise amount of pure aluminum vapor onto a very thin, durable film substrate.

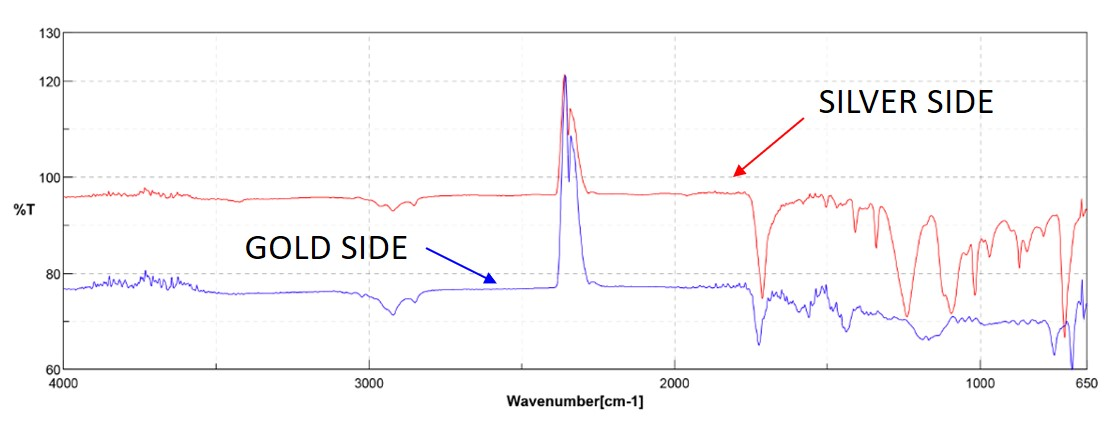
Infrared spectroscopy of emergency blanket

== Usage ==
In their principal usage, space blankets are included in many emergency, first aid, and survival kits because they are usually waterproof and windproof. That, along with their low weight and ability to pack into a small space, has made them popular among outdoor enthusiasts and emergency workers. Space blankets are often given to marathoners and other endurance athletes at the end of races, or while waiting before races if the weather is chilly. The material may be used in conjunction with conductive insulation material and may be formed into a bag for use as a bivouac sack (survival bag).

In first aid, the blankets are used to prevent or counter hypothermia. A threefold action facilitates this:

- The airtight foil reduces convection
- Heat loss caused by evaporation of perspiration is reduced
- The reflective surface inhibits losses caused by thermal radiation

In a hot environment, they can be used to provide shade or protection against radiated heat, but using them to wrap a person would be counterproductive, because body heat would get trapped by the airtight foil. This effect would exceed any benefit gained from heat reflection to the outside. Wearing a space blanket produces an insignificantly slower cooling rate after running in hot, humid conditions.

Space blankets are used to reduce heat loss from a person's body, but as they are constructed of PET film, they can be used for other applications for which this material is useful, such as insulating containers (e.g. DIY solar concentrators) and other applications.

In addition to the space blanket, the United States military also uses a similar blanket called the "casualty blanket". It uses a thermal reflective layer similar to the space blanket, backed by an olive drab-colored, reinforcing, outer layer. It provides greater durability and warmth than a basic space blanket at the cost of greater bulk and weight. It is also used as a partial liner inside the layers of bivouac sacks in very cold weather climates. Space blankets were also used by the Taliban to hide their heat signature from NATO forces.

== See also ==
- Emergency shelter
- Emissivity
- R-value (insulation)
- Radiant barrier
- Reflectivity
- Thermal insulation
- Thermoregulation
- Thin-film deposition
