= Materials for use in vacuum =

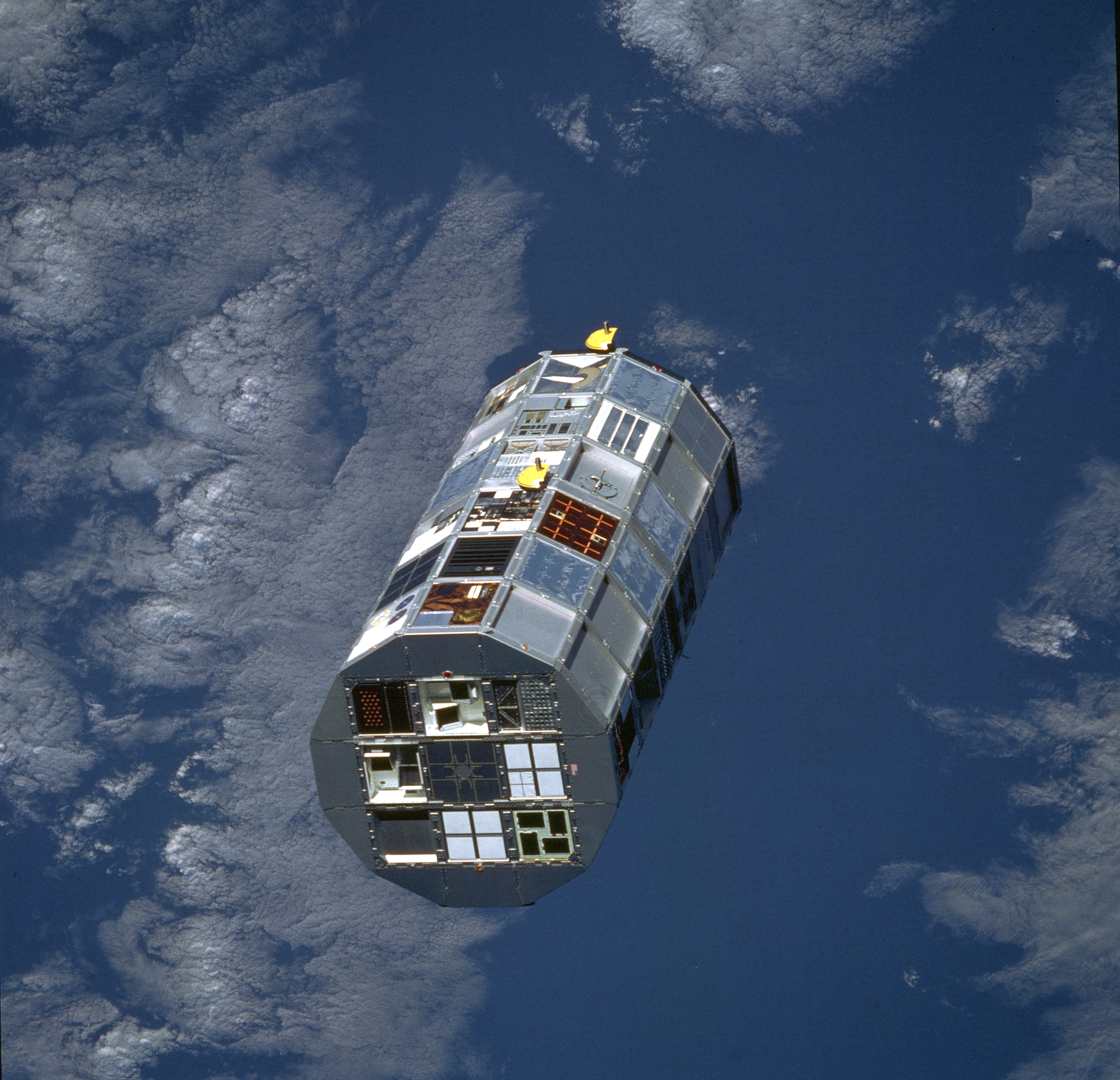
The Long Duration Exposure Facility was used to test various materials in vacuum.

Materials for use in vacuum need to show very low rates of outgassing in vacuum and, where applicable, be tolerant to bake-out temperatures. The requirements grow increasingly stringent with the desired degree of vacuum to be achieved in the vacuum chamber. Materials produce gas by several mechanisms. Molecules of gases and water can be adsorbed on the material surface (therefore materials with low affinity to water have to be chosen, which eliminates many plastics). Materials may sublimate in vacuum (this includes some metals and their alloys, most notably cadmium and zinc). Or the gases can be released from porous materials or from cracks and crevices. Traces of lubricants, residues from machining, can be present on the surfaces. A specific risk is outgassing of solvents absorbed in plastics after cleaning.

The gases liberated from the materials not only lower the vacuum quality, but also can be reabsorbed on other surfaces, creating deposits and contaminating the chamber.

Yet another problem is diffusion of gases through the materials themselves. Atmospheric helium can diffuse even through Pyrex glass, even if slowly (and elevated temperatures above room temperature are generally needed); this however is usually not an issue. Some materials might also expand or increase in size causing problems in delicate equipment.

In addition to the gas-related issues, the materials have to maintain adequate strength through the entire required temperature range (sometimes reaching cryogenic temperatures), maintain their properties (elasticity, plasticity, electrical and thermal conductivity or lack of it, etc.), be machinable, and if possible not be overly expensive. Yet another concern is the thermal expansion coefficient match of adjacent parts.

== Materials to avoid ==
Materials outgas by three mechanisms: release of absorbed gases (desorption from the bulk of the material), release of adsorbed gases (desorption from the surface only), and evaporation of the material itself. The former can be reduced by a bakeout, the latter is an intrinsic property of the material. Some outgassed materials can deposit on other surfaces, contaminate the vacuum system and be difficult to get rid of.

The most common sources of trouble (out-gassing) in vacuum systems are:

- Cadmium, often present in the form of cadmium plating, or in some soldering and brazing alloys
- Zinc, problematic for high vacuum and higher temperatures, present in some construction alloys, e.g. brass and some brazing alloys. Tends to poison hot cathodes and form conductive deposits on surfaces. Any materials that have been zinc-coated by galvanization should be avoided, or they have the coating removed first.
- Magnesium
- Paints
- Lead and antimony used in some soft solders due to outgassing at higher temperatures.
- Many plastics, namely many plastic tapes (special attention should be paid to adhesives). Fiberglass composites, e.g. Micarta (G-10) and G-30, should be avoided. Even Kapton and Teflon are sometimes advised against. See below for further discussion of plastics.
  - PVC, usually in the form of wire insulation (also a source of leaks)
- Various residues, e.g. flux from soldering and brazing, and lubricants from machining making thorough cleaning imperative. Getting the outgassable residues from tight crevices can be challenging; a good mechanical design that avoids such features can help.

There are also additional physical issues which come with vacuum, including the growth of whiskers from materials such as Tin or Zinc, which can cause physical issues or electrical shorts

== Review of materials and issues to consider ==
=== Metals ===
- Austenitic stainless steels are the most common choice for high vacuum and ultra-high vacuum systems. Not all alloys are suitable; e.g. the free-machining 303 steel contains sulfur, which tends to outgas. Alloys with good weldability under argon arc welding are usually chosen.
  - 304 stainless steel is a common choice of a stainless steel.
  - 304L stainless steel, a low-carbon variant of 304 steel, is used for ultra-high vacuum systems.
  - 316L stainless steel a low-carbon and low-magnetic stainless steel, used in accelerator technologies.
  - 347 stainless steel does not accept high polish.
  - 321 stainless steel is chosen when low magnetic permeability is needed.
- Mild steel can be used for moderate vacuums above 1×10^{−6} torrs (1.3×10^{−7} kPa). Outgassing can be lowered with suitable (e.g. nickel) plating. It has high permeability to hydrogen and tendency to rust. For use it should be thoroughly degassed in vacuum.
- Aluminium and aluminium alloys are another class of frequently used materials. They are well-machinable and have low outgassing, unless the alloys contain higher proportions of zinc. The parts must not be anodized, as the oxide layer traps (and then outgasses) water vapor. Anodizing also makes the surface non-conducting, so that its surface will charge up in electrostatic systems. The best treatment is Alochroming, which seals the surface, makes it hard and conductive. Its outgassing rate is considerably less than non-treated aluminium. Aluminium and its alloys have low strength at high temperatures, distort when being welded, and the copper-containing ones are poorly weldable. Aluminium wire rings can be used as cheap gaskets in demountable seals. Aluminium has high thermal conductivity, good corrosion resistance, and low solubility of hydrogen. Loss of strength at high temperatures limits its use in bakeable applications, but aluminium is advantageous for large-size systems due to its lower weight and lower cost than stainless steel. Use of aluminium is limited by difficulties in its welding and brazing. It can be used for x-ray windows.
- Aluminium bronze is a material that looks and machines similar to brass. It is not susceptible to galling, which makes it suitable for sliding fits against stainless steel.
- Nickel is widely used in vacuum technology, e.g. as mechanical parts in vacuum tubes. It is relatively low-cost, can be spot welded, can be easily machined, has high melting point and is resistant to many corrosive fluids and atmospheres. Its potential drawback is its ferromagnetism, which restricts applications that would be influenced by magnetic fields.
- Nickel alloys, e.g. cupronickel
- Beryllium is used primarily for x-ray windows.
- Oxygen-free copper is widely used. It is easily machined and has good corrosion resistance. It is unsuitable for bakeable vacuum envelopes due to its tendency to oxidize and create scales. Copper rings are used in demountable seals. Normal copper is unsuitable for high vacuum as it is difficult to outgas completely. Copper is insensitive to hydrogen and impermeable to hydrogen and helium, has low sensitivity to water vapor, but is attacked by mercury. Its strength falls sharply above 200 °C (392 °F). Its vapor pressure becomes significant at above 500 °C (932 °F).
- Brass is suitable for some applications. It has good corrosion resistance. Its zinc content may cause problems; zinc outgassing can be reduced by nickel-plating.
- Indium wire is used as a gasket in demountable seals.
- Gold wire is used as a gasket in demountable seals for ultra-high vacuum, as well as an alternative to lead-tin solder for making electrical connections.
- Platinum is a highly chemically inert material with high cost and low outgassing.
- Zirconium is corrosion-resistant. It has low production of secondary electrons, so it is used as a coating of areas where reducing their production is important. It is used for neutron windows. It is costly and scarce, its uses are therefore limited. Zirconium and zirconium hydride are used for getting.
- Tungsten is often used in high temperature applications as well as for filaments in electron/ion optics. It becomes brittle from work hardening when mechanically deformed, or subjected to very high temperatures.
- Molybdenum and tantalum are useful for high temperature applications.
- Titanium and niobium are good materials.
- Solders are sometimes unavoidable for soft-soldered joints. Tin-lead solders (Sn50Pb50, Sn60Pb40, Sn63Pb37) can be conditionally used when the apparatus is not to be baked and operating temperatures aren't elevated (lead tends to outgas). A better choice for vacuum systems is the tin-silver eutectic, Sn95Ag5 (Sn-Ag eutectic is actually 96.5-3.5); its melting point of 230 °C (446 °F) allows bakeout up to 200 °C (392 °F). A similar 95-5 alloy, Sn95Sb5, is unsuitable as antimony has similar vapor pressure as lead. Take care to remove flux residues.
- Brazing alloys are used for joining materials by brazing. Care has to be taken while choosing the alloys, as some elements tend to outgas. Cadmium and zinc are the worst common offenders. Silver, a common component of brazing alloys, can be problematic at higher temperatures and lower pressures. A silver-copper eutectic, named e.g. Cusil, is recommended. A superior alternative is a copper-silver-tin alloy called Cusiltin. Copper-silver-phosphorus alloys, e.g. Sil-Fos, are also suitable.

=== Plastics ===
- Some fluoropolymers, e.g. polyvinylidene fluoride, are suitable for use in vacuum. They have low outgassing and are tolerant to higher temperatures.
  - Polytetrafluoroethylene (PTFE or Teflon) is commonly used inside of vacuum systems. It is self-lubricating, a good electrical insulator, tolerant to fairly high temperatures, and has low out-gassing. It is not suitable for barrier between vacuum and atmosphere, as it is somewhat permeable for gases. Using Ceramic insulators is superior to using PTFE when possible.
- Polyethylene is usable but requires thorough out-gassing. Nalgene can be used as a cheaper alternative for bell jars.
- Vespel polyimide is very expensive, but machines well, has good electrical insulator properties and is compatible with ultra-high vacuum.
- PVC, despite its high outgassing rate, can be used in limited applications for rough vacuum lines.
- Nylon is self-lubricating but has high outgassing rate and high affinity to water.
- Acrylics have high outgassing rate and high affinity to water.
- Polycarbonates and polystyrene are good electrical insulators with moderate outgassing.
- PEEK (polyetheretherketone) has relatively low out-gassing values (0.31% total mass loss (TML), 0.00% collected volatile condensable material (CVCM), 0.06% water vapour regained (WVR)).
- Kapton is a type of polyimide film, has very low outgassing. Kapton is discouraged if a ceramic alternative can be used.
- Some elastomers have sufficient vacuum properties to be employed in vacuum o-rings:
  - NBRs (nitrile rubber), commonly used for demountable vacuum seals (bakeable only up to 100 °C).
  - FKMs (FPMs) (Viton) is used for demountable vacuum seals. It is better for lower pressures than nitrile rubber and chemically much more inert. It is bakeable to 200 °C.
  - FFKMs (FFPMs) very low out-gassing similar to PTFE and withstands baking temperatures up to 300 °C, while chemically one of the most inert sealing elastomers.

=== Glasses and ceramics ===
- Borosilicate glass is often used for smaller assemblies and for viewports. It can be machined and joined well. Glasses can be joined with metals.
- Porcelain and alumina ceramics, when fully vitrified and therefore non-porous, are excellent insulators usable up to 1500 °C. Some ceramics can be machined. Ceramics can be joined with metals.
- Macor is a machinable ceramic that is an excellent alternative to alumina, as the firing process of alumina can change the dimensions and tolerances.

=== Lubricants ===
Lubrication of moving parts is a problem for vacuum. Many lubricants have unacceptable outgassing rates, others (e.g. graphite) lose lubricating properties.

- Vacuum greases are greases with low outgassing.
  - Ramsay grease is an old composition of paraffin wax, vaseline and natural rubber, usable up to about 25 °C, for low vacuums to about 1 Pa.
  - Krytox is a fluorether-based vacuum grease, useful from −75 to over 350 °C, not flammable even in liquid oxygen, and highly resistant to ionizing radiation.
  - Polyphenyl ether greases
  - Torrlube, a brand encompassing a range of lubricating oils based on perfluoropolyethers.
- Dry lubricants, can be incorporated in plastics as fillers, as a component of sintered metals, or deposited on metal, ceramic and plastic surfaces.
  - Molybdenum disulfide is a dry lubricant usable in vacuum.
  - Tungsten disulfide is another dry lubricant usable in vacuum. It can be used at higher temperatures than MoS_{2}. Tungsten disulfide used to be significantly more expensive, but molybdenum disulfide prices have risen to a comparable range. Usable from −188 to +1316 °C in vacuum, from −273 to +650 °C in normal atmosphere.
  - Hexagonal boron nitride is a graphite-like dry lubricant used in space vehicles.

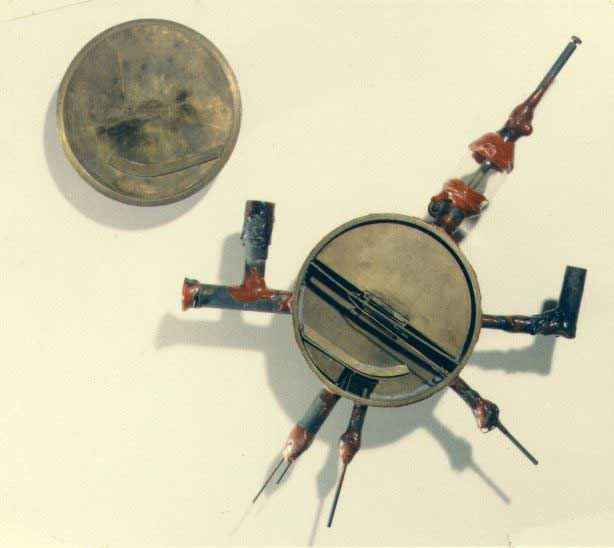
Ernest Lawrence's 4-inch cyclotron. A D-shaped cyclotron that contains glass-to-metal vacuum joints made from Faraday Wax.

=== Adhesives ===
- Torr-Seal, or its generic equivalent Hysol-1C (US brand name) or Loctite 9492 (EU brand name), is an epoxy with resin and hardener for use in vacuum environments. It will begin to degrade at high temperatures but otherwise is very stable with very little outgassing. Other vacuum-rated epoxies are also available. For mounting or joining thin metal foils, grids, or other small pieces that are not expected to undergo stress, silver or gold paste may be used as an adhesive. After fixing the material(s) with silver paste, the piece must be baked (to >200 °C) in air for >24 hours to remove volatiles prior to insertion into vacuum.
- Faraday Wax is perhaps a cheaper alternative to Torr-Seal, but just as effective. Indeed some of its physical properties make it more favourable than epoxies. Faraday Wax is a malleable dark red solid with a low melting point. Joints can be made with Faraday Wax via heating the two surfaces to be joined, then press the wax against the heated surfaces similar to soldering. These joints are suitable down to 10^{−7} mbar and can be made between glass and metal. It was first described by Michael Faraday in "Chemical Manipulation" 1827. By weight:
  - 1 part beeswax
  - 5 parts colophony (rosin)
  - 1 part Venetian red
- A modern wax intended for high-vacuum use is Apiezon Wax W.

== Materials for use in space ==
In addition to the concerns above, materials for use in spacecraft applications have to cope with radiation damage and high-intensity ultraviolet radiation, thermal loads from solar radiation, radiation cooling of the vehicle in other directions, and heat produced within the spacecraft's systems. Another concern, for orbits closer to Earth, is the presence of atomic oxygen, leading to corrosion of exposed surfaces; aluminium is an especially sensitive material. Silver, often used for surface-deposited interconnects, forms a layer of silver oxide that flakes off and may erode up to a total failure.

Corrosion-sensitive surfaces can be protected by a suitable plating, most often with gold; a silica layer is also possible. However the coating layer is subject to erosion by micrometeoroids.

== See also ==
- Vacuum engineering
