= Sunshield =

- Sunshield removable covers for tanks, making them resemble trucks, in Operation Bertram
- Sunshield meaning a Space sunshade
- James Webb Space Telescope sunshield
