= Nanosponges =

Porous nanoparticle, often a synthesised carbon-containing polymer

Nanosponges are a type of nanoparticle, often a synthesized carbon-containing polymer. They are porous in structure, pores being about 1–2 nanometers in size, and can therefore be targeted to absorb small amounts of matter or toxin. Nanosponges are often used in medicine as targeted drug delivery systems, detoxification methods, or as a way of damage control after an injury. They can also be used in environmental applications to clean up ecosystems by performing tasks like purifying water or metal deposits. Their small size allows them to move quickly through substances, like water or blood, efficiently finding and attacking unwanted matter. Nanosponges are often synthetically manufactured but oftentimes include natural materials to improve their efficiency when injected into the body. Nanosponges are superior to microsponges in application as the smaller size allows less disruption into the system in which it is implemented therefore imposing less risk of failed or detrimental effects. The prefix "nano" implies that items of this size are measured on a scale of $10^{-9}$meters.

== History ==
Nanosponges were first referred to as "cyclodextrin nanosponges" by DeQuan Li and Min Ma in 1998. This term was used because there is a cross-linked β-cyclodextrin with organic diisocyanates. An insoluble network is present in this structure, which shows a high inclusion constant. These polymers are formed through the reaction of native cyclodextrins with a cross-linking agent, the latter influencing the behavior and properties of the entire unit.

Cyclodextrin nanosponges were not discovered to have potential in being drug carriers until work done by Trotta and colleagues. They performed syntheses of new kinds of cyclodextrin nanosponges that revealed many potential applications that had not been previously considered.

== Mechanisms ==
=== Structure ===
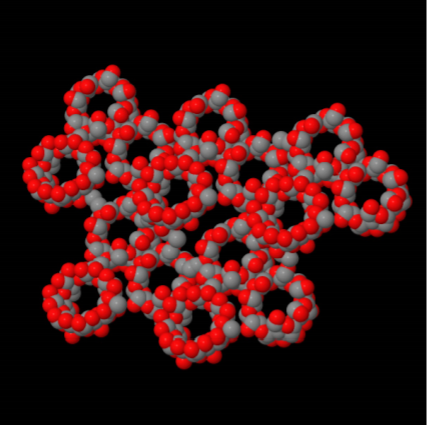
Molecular cyclodextrin nanosponge structure

Cyclodextrins are a class of cyclic glucopyranose oligomers, with common structures of α, β, and γ. α-cyclodextrins comprise six glucopyranose units, β- cyclodextrins comprise seven, and γ comprise eight. Cyclodextrins are biological nanomaterials whose molecular structure greatly influences their supramolecular properties. To synthesize cyclodextrins, enzymatic action occurs on hydrolyzed starch.

Cyclodextrin nanosponges are made of a three dimensional cross-linked polymer network. They can be made with α, β, and γ cyclodextrins. The inclusion capacity and the solubilizing capacity of the nanosponges can be tuned according to how much of the cross-linking agent is used.

=== Functions ===
Cyclodextrins have a toroidal shape, which allows them to have a cavity inside which can fit other molecules. This useful structure allows them to act as drug carriers in the body, as long as the compounds to be delivered have compatible geometry and polarity with the cavity. To determine when these compounds are delivered, the structure of the cyclodextrin nanosponge can be modified to release its contents sooner or later. Several ligands can be conjugated on the surface of the nanosponge to determine where it will target in the body.

== Naturally inspired synthetic nanosponges ==
=== Liposomes ===
When injected into the body, synthetic nanosponges made of liposomes can be coated with leukocytes. These leukocytes can be incorporated in nanoparticles though methods known as the "ghost-cell" or "hitchhiking" strategy. Hitchhiking strategy is when nanoparticles are trafficked by living leukocytes. The ghost cell method entails nanoparticles coated in the natural membrane. Since they are coated with leukocytes, the nanosponges will pull towards a location of infection or foreign matter in the body. The nanosponges avoid macrophage attack because they are coated with natural materials. Researchers have only tested these in lab animals but suggest the liposome nanosponge could be easier to get approved by the FDA for in-patient use. Researchers have found promising results in using these nanosponges in drug delivery, relieving inflammation, and repairing damaged tissue.

=== Coatings (RBC & RBC-PL) ===
Common pathogens can be toxins that form pores in a cell membrane. These cells target red blood cells. When there are no red blood cells around, these toxins target platelets. Nanorobots with a coating similar to red blood cells and platelets exist, allowing them to be disguised as a red blood cell and/or platelet. These RBC-PL coated nanorobots display efficient propulsion in blood without apparent biofouling. Their movement mimics the movement of natural cells. This ability to blend in enhances their ability to bind to platelet-adhering pathogens. The increased binding ability helps the nanorobots more effectively neutralize toxins because a pathogen that targets these types of cells would be more likely to interact with the nanorobots. This, in turn, increases the amount of collisions and interactions between the nanorobots and the pathogens/toxins. The nanorobots help to absorb and remove the toxins and bacteria. Other functions of these nanorobots are the ability to neutralize cytolytic activity regardless of the molecular structure, enhancing mass transport, and they may also be able to fight auto-immune diseases. Having a natural coating on something synthetic allows the nanorobots to have the benefits of both natural and synthetic materials.

== Environmental application ==
=== Oil pollution in the ground ===
Substances like crude oil and tar pollute the ground and are difficult to clean up because of how they stick to dirt and soil. These toxic materials slipping into the soil can cause detrimental health effects to animals and people who consume plants grown in this soil. Current methods of trying to remove these pollutants from hazardous waste sites have proven to be costly and inefficient. Engineers at Cornell University have created a 20 nanometer long particle that can self assemble in water so that its orientation allows for a hydrophilic exterior and hydrophobic interior. These particles are small enough to travel quickly through sand and soil without getting trapped. The Cornell researchers injected these nanoparticles into the bottom of a steel column filled with sand contaminated by phenanthrene and a polycyclic aromatic hydrocarbon (PAH), components typically found in tar. They watched as the nanoparticles traveled up the column, cleaning the sand along the way. The hydrophobic cores of the nanosponge drew the phenanthrene off the sand grains and into the interior of the sponge.

Researchers intend to one day use this technology to improve upon "pump and treat remediation," in which polluted groundwater is pumped up to the surface, cleaned of its pollutants, and then injected back into the ground. With these nanoparticles implemented, pollutants can be more efficiently collected without getting trapped in the soil. Once cleaned of the toxins they have collected, they can be injected into the soil once more to continue cleaning.

=== Purification of wastewater ===
Some nanosponges are made to be eco-friendly and have a high concentration of carboxyl groups. They are used to remove metal deposits in wastewater in the oceans, where organisms can absorb these deposits which leads to detrimental build up in their tissue. The concentration of heavy metals grows while going up the food chain as organisms eat other organisms. Being at the top of the food pyramid, humans are most at risk for the detrimental effects of these metals in our food. These effects include allergic reactions, insomnia, vision problems, and can be as extreme as to cause mental disability, dementia, and kidney disease. Unlike many organic pollutants, heavy metals can be removed and destroyed by using nanomaterials like nanosponges. These nanomaterials act as sustainable filtering materials by binding to metals and removing them from wastewater before they disperse into the ecosystem. Using nanosponges for this results in a higher efficiency and lower cost than alternative cleaning methods like ion exchange resins, activated carbon, or other biological agents. Porous materials produced from renewable and low cost sources, like cellulose, chitin, or starch, are one of the most promising classes of absorbents in terms of effectiveness.

Cyclodextrins (CDs) and amylose are derived from starches and are well known for their peculiar structural features and complex properties. The internal cavities in these CDs serve as sites for hydrophobic or very weakly hydrophilic molecules and hence generate a strong affinity to organic molecules at water-solid interfaces. In order to properly bind metal to these CDs, dextrins must be chemically changed by adding an acidic functional group. These functional groups are allowed to undergo deprotonation in an aqueous media so the reaction of these with the hydroxyl groups in dextrin allows negatively charged insoluble polymers to be created . These polymers are known as nanosponges for their porous characteristic; they are able to bond to both organic molecules and metal deposits. After cleaning, these nanosponges can easily be separated from the water through simple filtration since they are insoluble in all solvents.

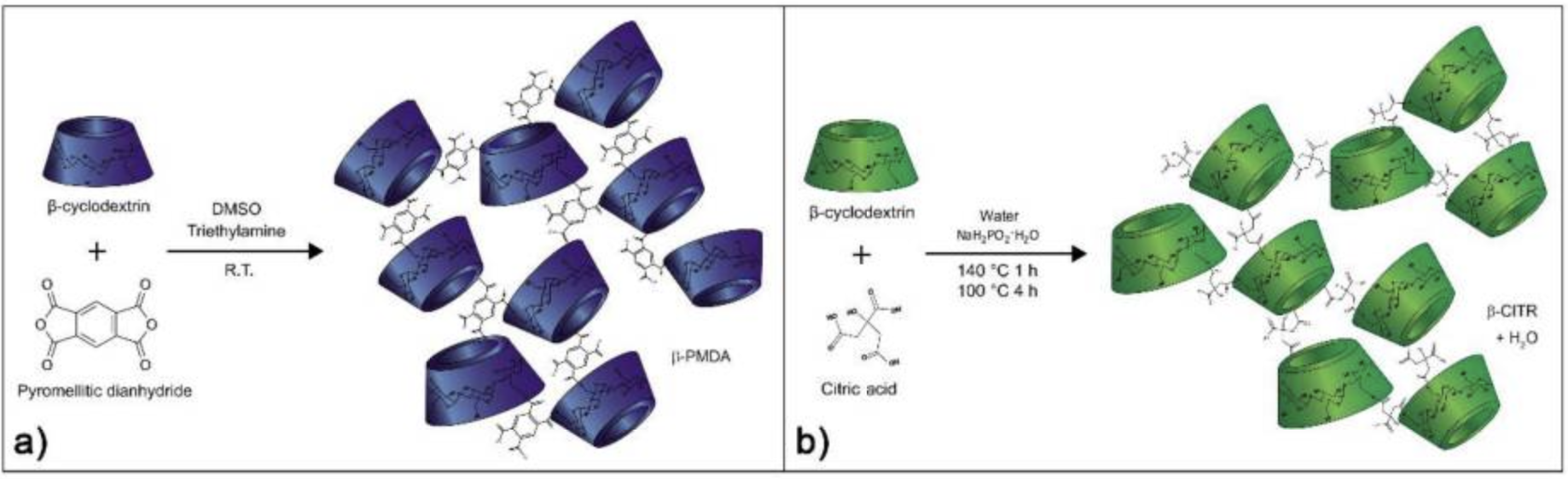
Schematic representation of the synthesis reaction of β-PMDA (a) and β-CITR (b).

One type of nanosponge being researched is prepared with β-cyclodextrins and a linear pea starch derivative called linecaps. β-cyclodextrins are used due to low cost and medium-sized pores allowing for a broad range of guest molecules to be collected. Additionally, β-cyclodextrins are favored over dextrin polymers, as they can interact with transition metals also. Primary and secondary hydroxyl groups can act as coordination sites with some metal ions, and CDs can coordinate more than one ion at a time. These two components are reacted with citric acid in water to create the nanosponges using sodium hypophosphate monohydrate as a catalyst for the reaction. These nanosponges were compared to the performance of nanosponges synthesized in the same manner substituting PDMA (pyromellitate substance) for citric acid.

A high number of cross-links were introduced into the synthesis process in order to create a maximum amount of carboxyl groups. This allowed for a higher complexation ability of these nanosponges to other molecules. A high degree of cross-linking generally leads to low swellable polymers which are more suited for water treatment, as the water will not take up the space meant for metal waste and can more easily be filtered from water after cleaning. Higher contact time leads to higher efficiency of the cleaning of nanosponges in wastewater.

It was found, at high metal concentrations, that pyromellitate was able to absorb more metal deposits. At low concentrations, they both performed nearly identical. However, in the presence of interfering sea water, citrate nanosponges were able to selectively absorb more metal than the PDMA nanosponges, allowing them to be more effective in the cleanup of metal from salt water. Although the research of these citric acid nanosponges is still undergoing revision and development, they show promise for being a sustainable way to clean metal deposits from the ecosystem.

== Medical applications ==
=== Drug delivery ===
Nanosponges are being researched to be used for drug delivery systems to treat cancer and infectious diseases. Although nanosponges are one three-thousandth the size of red blood cells, they each can carry thousands of drug molecules. They can hide in the immune system where immune cells try to destroy and remove foreign material from the body. Particles coated with membranes from circulating red blood cells cannot be detected. Additionally, particles coated with membranes from circulating white blood cells or leukocytes avoid attack from macrophages.

Major concerns regarding recently developed chemical entities include pharmacokinetic issues, poor solubility in water, and low bioavailability. These lead to obstacles when using conventional drug dosage forms. Nanosponges can conquer these problems as their porous structure allows them the unique capability to entrap both hydrophilic and hydrophobic drugs and release them in a highly predictable manor. These small sponges travel throughout the body until they reach the targeted site where they bind to the surface and perform controlled drug release. Nanosponge technology is widely explored for its use in drug delivery using oral, parenteral, and topical administration techniques. This may include substances such as antineoplastic agents, proteins and peptides, volatile oils, and genetic materials. These small sponges travel throughout the body until they reach the targeted site where they bind to the surface and perform controlled drug release. Potential applications in target site-specific drug delivery include the lungs, spleen, and liver.

=== Fight antibiotic resistance ===
Membrane-coated nanosponges could be used to fight antibiotic resistance because they trap and remove toxins from blood. Toxins that attack red blood cells will cling to nanosponges because the sponges are coated with living cells. The sponges absorb the toxins, so they can no longer harm the cells, and the toxins are taken to the liver and broken down.

=== Detoxification ===
A study was conducted to determine nanosponges' ability to absorb pore-forming toxins. Pore-forming toxins (PFTs) are the most common protein toxins found in nature. They disrupt cells by forming pores in cellular membranes which alter the permeability of the cells. Examples of this include bacterial infections and venom. These venoms all use a pore-forming strategy, in which they create pores in the cells they attack in order for them to leak until they are no longer functional. The idea behind this study was that by limiting PFTs the severity of bacterial infections may be able to be reduced. The study was conducted using a nanosponge (polymeric core) wrapped in a natural red blood cell membrane bilayer so that the bacteria or venom will attack it. The polymeric core stabilizes the membrane shell and the membrane bilayer allows the nanosponge to absorb a wide range of PFTs. Testing was done to determine the ability of the nanosponges to neutralize PFTs. Researchers found that the nanosponge absorbed membrane-damaging toxins and diverted them away from their cellular targets. In mice, the nanosponges significantly reduced the toxicity of staphylococcal α-hemolysin and improved the survival rate.

The membrane draped nanoparticles work so that once a toxin has attacked, it is trapped within the scaffolding of the nanosponge. After the nanosponge is full of toxins and cannot trap anymore it moves to the liver to filter out the toxins. Researchers are posed with is how to tackle all the different types of bacteria and venom, making a lot of different nanosponges for each specific bacteria and venom is nearly impossible. As of now they are focusing on toxins such as; E. coli, MRSA, pneumonia, bee venom, snake venom and sea anemone venom. A single nanosponge can capture many of the bacteria and venoms, instead of being tailored to each individually because when the venom physically tried to induce a whole in the red blood cell membrane, the venom will get stuck inside the sponge.

An obstacle researchers are faced with is the lifespan of the nanosponges. Once nanosponges are injected they can move rapidly through the blood system, and be found in the liver to be filtered out within hours. This means the nanosponge does not have enough time to soak up the maximum amount of toxin that it can hold. Researchers are working on a technique using hydrogel to coat the nanosponges to increase the life of the nanosponge and help them to remain stationary after injection to more efficiently purge the body of toxins. A study done by The University of California found that 80 percent of nanosponges coated with a hydrogel lasted more than two days after injection. Only 20 percent of nanosponges not coated in the hydrogel lasted two hours after injection, and diffused to other locations in the body.

== Safety applications ==
=== Explosive detection ===
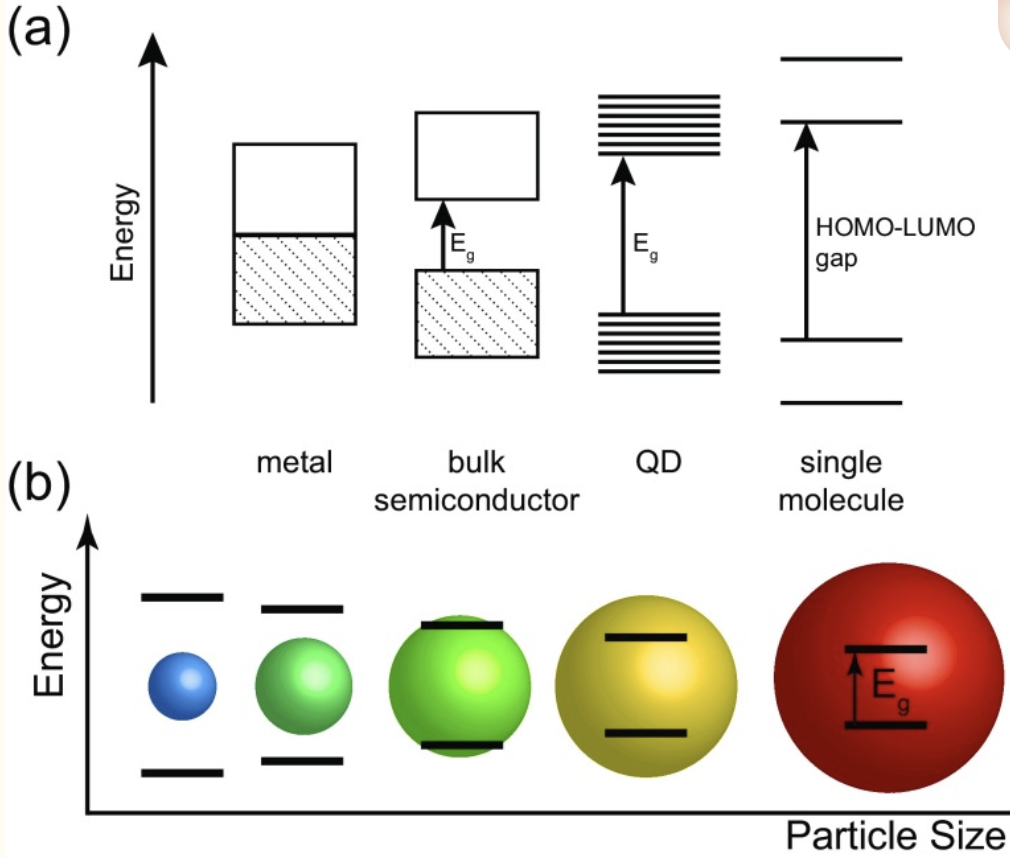
Schematic of band structures of metals, semiconductors, quantum dots (QD) and single. Graphic illustrating the change in QD band gap and photoluminescence emission wavelength, or color, with increasing particle size.

Properties of nanoparticles can be altered through nanoparticle-ligand systems which are targeted to specific analytes. Electromagnetic properties of nanosponges can be altered by analyte binding to be used as a transducer in chemical sensing systems, specifically for explosive analytes. Sensors based on these properties are intended to detect low concentrations of explosive analytes in both solution and vapor phase based detection. These systems can be built from detection systems from standard components as the signal collected from these transducers is measured with standard scientific instrumentation, allowing this to be a more applicable option of explosive detection. Semiconducting metal oxides are widely considered as the most promising platform for solid-state gas sensors. Due to enhanced responsiveness of conductance to surface effects, various forms of metal oxides that have been nanostructured have been synthesized and their sensing properties studied.

Surface plasmon resonance (SPR) band of colloidal gold nanoparticles (AuNPs) is one electromagnetic property that was examined. In AuNPs, the free electrons within the metal surface will interact with light, which results in large oscillations in the surface electromagnetic field. This results in the particles absorbing light strongly at the particular resonant frequencies of these electrons, promoting SPR bands. In order to use this concept in sensor systems, one must use them in surface enhances Raman spectroscopy (SERS). A Raman spectrum can be used to fingerprint a molecule, using incident light to excite Raman active vibrational modes irreversible scattering of photons. This creates a unique spectrum that can provide information on molecular shape. The spectrum obtained from an unknown analyte can be compared to the library of known spectra to identify any threats.

Raman scattering is very weak, making detection difficult to enhancement is required. If a molecule is bound to a metal surface, incident light excites the surface plasmons, inducing polarization in the bound molecules, increasing the amount of irreversible scattered light from the Raman vibrational modes leading to signal enhancement. The best SERS enhancement is achieved by having strong localized plasmons that fall within the wavelength of the Raman laser excitation, which is why gold and silver are often used. With their SPR bands being anywhere from 400 to 800 nanometers, the SPR bands in gold and silver particles are easy to access with visible light. Additionally, they are stable in air as they are chemically inert.

The fluorescence of colloidal semiconductors is another property analyzed in creating sensor systems. Quantum dots are semiconducting nanoparticles which are small enough to confine a generated hole-electron pair in all three spatial directions, leading to quantization of the energy levels causing the electronic structure of the material to sit between a classical semiconductor and a classic molecular material. This quantization causes nanoparticles to display sharp photon absorption and emission bands, and the band gap is closely related to the size of the nanoparticle. Fluorescence arises from photoexcitation in these quantum dots and is easily tuned to the visible or near infrared region of the spectrum, by choice of semiconductor material and particle size, making quantum-useful fluorophores. Quantum dots have many properties of interest in order to be used as chemical sensors, including their high fluorescent quantum yields, resistance to photobleaching, and broad absorption allowing for narrow emission bands. They lend themselves nicely to multichannel fluorophore systems, with single excitation wavelength causing emission from many species of many different colors. The surface of these particles can be changed with targeting ligands to allow specific fluorescent enhancement. These optical properties of quantum dots are being exploited to build an explosive sensing array of dots. By combining multichannel fluorophore systems with variable response to different explosives, it is possible to identify different explosives at low concentrations. This technology can be used in wastewater or ground pollution, as well in areas of hazardous waste to identify areas of threat or contaminated substances that could cause health risks to people and animals.

== Current primary medical research ==
Current research is mainly being done for medical application for use of nanosponges in treating bacterial infections (sepsis, pneumonia, and skin and soft tissue infections), viral infections (zika, HIV, and influenza), autoimmune diseases (rheumatoid arthritis, autoimmune hemolytic anemia, immune thrombocytopenic purpura), and venoms (snakes and other animals). A lot of research is only in its primary stages as implementing these solution to the human body poses many risks for which these applications of nanosponges are not yet developed enough.

=== Brain injury reduction ===
Nanosponges have been tested experimentally on mice and have been shown to reduce swelling from brain or head injury. When an injury occurs, tissue in the area of injury will swell and immune cells will race to the damages area. When this injury is in the head, this racing of immune cells will lead to swelling in the brain and can be dangerous because the brain is contained within the cell and therefore there is no place for it to move leading to pressure in the head that can be detrimental. Research suggest nanoparticles can be injected into the head as a way to distract immune cells from rushing to the brain which will reduce swelling.

After head injury, mice were left to be for two to three hours and subsequently injected with biodegradable nanoparticles made from an unspecified but FDA approved polymer which is commonly used in some dissolving sutures. Instead of rushing to the head, some immune cells called monocytes ran towards these nanosponges instead of the brain. The monocytes engulfed the nanoparticles and the cells as well as the nanoparticles are then sent to the spleen for elimination in the body. Because the elimination of these particles can happen so fast, researchers were able to inject mice once more two to three days later to combat inflammation that might come back slowly after injury. Mice with this treatment fared better in recovery than those that did not receive this injection and the injured spot reduced to half its size in mice with the nanoparticle treatment. Mice's vision cells performed better in response to light and were able to better walk across a ladder after recovering showing improvement in behavior and motor function.

Other potential therapies to treat trauma rely on drugs or other cargo to be sent alongside the nanoparticles however this study was done using bare nanoparticles making it cheaper and safer in trial as less material is injected into the organism.

Researchers have not tested this study on human injury. Factors like severity of injury and general recovery time will determine the effects of sending these nanoparticles inside the body. The way the brain suffers involve more bodily reactions that simply this immune response and if accumulation of nanoparticles if not removed from the body fast enough, they may spread to other parts of the body and cause toxic damage.

=== Macrophage biomimetic nanoparticles for management of sepsis ===
Currently, sepsis treatments are lacking. Most treatments are just supportive and not effective against fighting the infection. Research that uses nanoparticles that are biomimetic to macrophages. The macrophage coating onto the nanoparticle surface increases the surface to volume ratio of the nanoparticle. This increased ratio is important for efficient endotoxin neutralization. These macrophages act as decoys that can bind to and neutralize endotoxins. Without neutralizing these endotoxins, an immune response would be triggered. These nanoparticles are able to sequester proinflammatory cytokines which inhibit the ability to start a septic response. These have been tested in a mouse Escherichia coli bacteremia model, where the nanoparticles were able to significantly increase the survival of the mice by decreasing the proinflammatory cytokine levels and preventing the bacteria from disseminating. This cannot be replicated in the medical field yet, but it shows promise toward being able to treat sepsis.

=== Treating ischemic strokes ===
Mn_{3}O_{4}@nanoerythrocyte-T7 (MNET) nanosponges can regulate oxygen and scavenge free radicals in the event of an ischemic stroke, which is a global leading cause of death and disability. These engineered nanosponges can help attenuate hypoxia after a stroke by mimicking red blood cells and increasing the amount of oxygen in the infarct area. This allows for the extension of the survival time of neurocytes, a crucial part of treating an ischemic stroke because their normal functions must be maintained.

MNET works because it contains hemoglobin, which allows for there to be an oxygen sponge effect. This effect works by releasing oxygen in hypoxic areas and absorbing it in oxygen-rich areas. The sponge effect, along with the free radical scavenging, can successfully and efficiently treat ischemic strokes.

Biomimetic nanoparticles, like MNET nanosponges, can easily pass the Blood-Brain Barrier (BBB). The efficiency of the BBB-crossing of MNET is improved by the T7 peptide, which is critical in treating an ischemic stroke. In a study on middle cerebral artery occlusion (MCAO) rats, those treated with MNET experienced a significant attenuation of neurological damage.

== Limitations of research ==
Although research is moving forward, scientists have found some limitations. The use of both natural exterior components with synthetic interior components increases the complexity of development of nanosponges. Low solubility and aqueous instability are leading causes of structural complexity. Additionally, their small size and unique properties at the nanoscale make it difficult to fully extract them out of the body or ecosystem, which could cause increasing amounts of unwanted synthetic material in the environment or in the body. For this reason, it is also hard to conduct human studies. Like any medical research, there is a large range of risk associated with implementing new treatments, as results could potentially be fatal. If nanoparticles are unable to be extracted from the body, the toxicity content could cause internal harm to the patient. The body's rejection of these nanoparticles could also cause an unwanted immunoresponse, which could harm the body more than helping it. For example, Dr. Zhang of the University of California, San Diego suggests that for rheumatoid arthritis, this could elicit an immune response, therefore, not fighting the disease but driving it. If neutrophil membranes are used to coat nanoparticles, they contain autoantigens which causes an immune response.
