= UPILEX =

Heat-resistant polyimide film

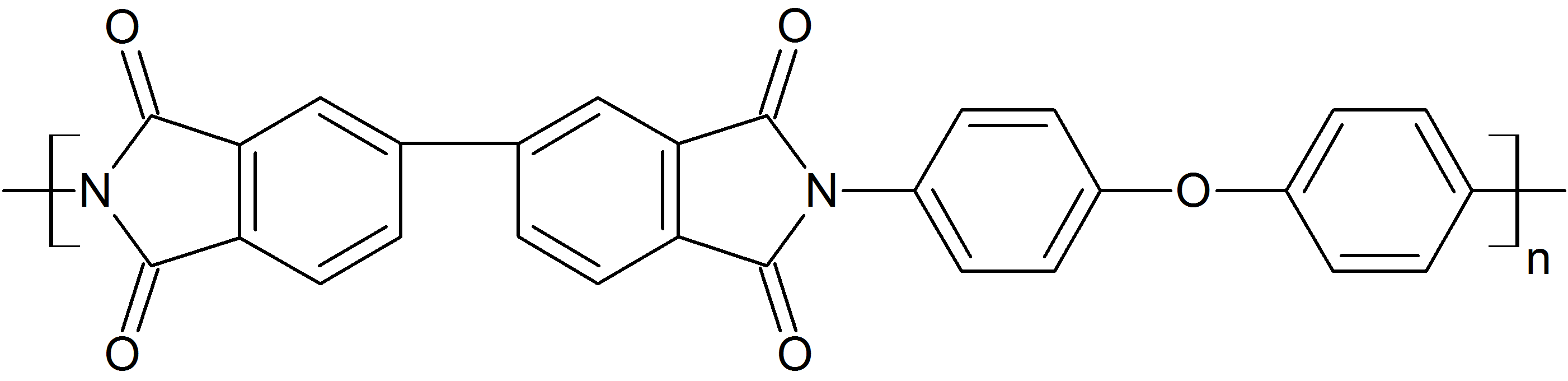
Structure of UBE's Upilex®

Upilex is a heat-resistant polyimide film that is the product of the polycondensation reaction between biphenyl tetracarboxylic dianhydride (BPDA) monomers and a diamine. Its properties include dimensional stability, low water absorption, high chemical resistance and high mechanical properties (up to 550 MPa depending on film thickness), high heat and chemical resistance. It was developed by UBE Industries. Upilex-S is the standard grade but other grades include Upilex-RN, VT, CA and SGA. Upilex-S is used when excellent mechanical properties are required. Upilex-RN possesses excellent molding processability, while Upilex-VT has superior heat bonding characteristics. General applications of Upilex include their use in flexible printed circuits, electric motor and generator insulation, high temperature wire and cable wrapping, and specialty pressure sensitive tapes. Polyimides have also been extensively studied in gas and humidity sensors, where the concentration is determined by monitoring the capacitance of modified Upilex films. With advantages of flexibility and easy functionalization, Upilex films are often used as substrate materials in biosensor platforms. For instance, it is possible to electropolymerize onto these films or attach enzymes to it for the detection of glucose.

Upilex-S, along with other polyimides Kapton HN and Kapton E, have been investigated by NASA with respect to their radiation durability for possible use in the Next Generation Space Telescope (later renamed the James Webb Space Telescope), where polymer film layer sunshields must operate at low temperatures and in the presence of cosmic rays. Flexible superstrate solar cells have been directly grown on commercially available Upilex foils, which makes for lightweight solar cells with a high specific power. Micro-heating elements can be integrated on polyimide sheets, which gives it the benefit of robustness and low-power consumption required for high temperatures. Upilex membranes are not transparent because of their aromatic C-H stretching band, but this can be altered by substituting hydrogen atoms by deuterium atoms.

== See also ==
- James Webb Space Telescope sunshield
- Kapton
- Polyamide
- Polyamide-imide
- Polyimide
- Polyimide film
