= SP21 =

SP21 may refer to:

- SP21 computer game, a classic computer game for PDP-11 and DVK
- SP-21 Barak, a pistol was developed by Israel Military Industries (IMI) in 2002
- SP-21 (Brazil), a State highway in Brazil
- USS Zita (SP-21), a motorboat that the United States Navy assigned to service as a patrol vessel in 1917 during World War I
- a type of Vespel plastic made by DuPont
