= BPDA =

Names
- Preferred IUPAC name [5,5′-Bi-2-benzofuran]-1,1′,3,3′-tetrone
- Other names 3,3',4,4′-Biphenyltetracarboxylic dianhydride; 4,4′-Biphthalic dianhydride

Identifiers
CAS Number	2420-87-3
3D model (JSmol)	Interactive image
Abbreviations	BPDA
ChemSpider	68023
ECHA InfoCard	100.017.585
PubChem CID	75494
UNII	SN5KO2N6PC
CompTox Dashboard (EPA)	DTXSID8044886
- InChI: InChI=1S/C16H6O6/c17-13-9-3-1-7(5-11(9)15(19)21-13)8-2-4-10-12(6-8)16(20)22-14(10)18/h1-6H Key: WKDNYTOXBCRNPV-UHFFFAOYSA-N; InChI=1/C16H6O6/c17-13-9-3-1-7(5-11(9)15(19)21-13)8-2-4-10-12(6-8)16(20)22-14(10)18/h1-6H Key: WKDNYTOXBCRNPV-UHFFFAOYAA
- SMILES: O=C4OC(=O)c3c4cc(c1ccc2C(=O)OC(=O)c2c1)cc3

Properties
Chemical formula	C_{16}H_{6}O_{6}
Molar mass	294.218 g·mol^{−1}
- Except where otherwise noted, data are given for materials in their standard state (at 25 °C [77 °F], 100 kPa). Infobox references

BPDA or biphenyl-tetracarboxylic acid dianhydride is a monomer used in the production of some polyimides.

== Applications ==
- Tape automated bonding (TAB), chip on film (COF), lead lock tape, high density flexible printed circuit (FPC), stiffener for FPC, office automation equipment, flexible solar cells, speaker diaphragms (for mobile phones, plasma televisions and car audio, etc.), heavy electric machinery, office automation equipment, thermal control film for satellites, printed circuit boards, metallic substrates, sheet heating elements, heat resistance wires.

== Characteristics ==
- Physical, mechanical, electrical, and chemical properties under high-temperature conditions.
- High tensile strength and modulus, and also features outstanding long-term heat resistance.

== Analytics ==
The chemical shifts in ^{1}H and ^{13}C NMR spectroscopy are given in the literature. The melting point is 299 - 301 °C.

== See also ==
- Polyamide
- UPILEX
