= Kapton =

Plastic film material used in low and high-temperature applications

Structure of poly-oxydiphenylene-pyromellitimide

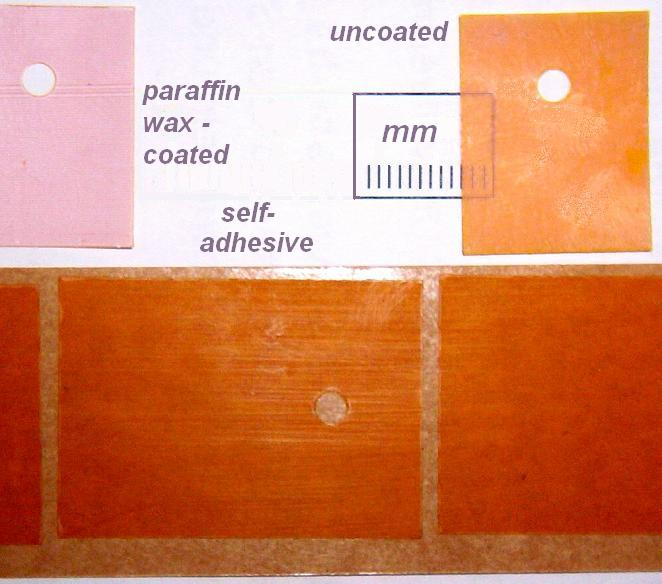
Kapton insulating pads for mounting electronic parts on a heat sink

Kapton is a polyimide film used in flexible printed circuits (flexible electronics) and space blankets, which are used on spacecraft, satellites, and various space instruments. Invented by the DuPont Corporation in the 1960s, Kapton remains stable across a wide range of temperatures, from 4 to 673 K (−269 to +400 °C). Kapton is used in electronics manufacturing and space applications, with x-ray equipment, and in 3D printing applications. Its favorable thermal properties and outgassing characteristics result in its regular use in cryogenic applications and in high vacuum environments.

== History ==
Kapton was invented by DuPont in the 1960s. As of November 2025, Kapton is manufactured by Qnity Electronics, a spinoff of DuPont.

The name Kapton is a registered trademark of E. I. du Pont de Nemours and Company.

== Chemistry and variants ==
Kapton synthesis is an example of the use of a dianhydride in step polymerization. The intermediate polymer, known as a poly(amic acid), is soluble because of strong hydrogen bonds to the polar solvents usually employed in the reaction. The ring closure is carried out at high temperatures of 470–570 K (200–300 °C).

The chemical name for Kapton K and HN is poly (4,4'-oxydiphenylene-pyromellitimide). It is produced from the condensation of pyromellitic dianhydride (PMDA) and 4,4'-oxydiphenylamine (ODA).

Kapton E is made from a mix of two dianhydrides, PMDA and biphenyltetracarboxylic acid dianhydride (BPDA), and two diamines, ODA and p-phenylenediamine (PPD). The BPDA component adds greater dimensional stability and flatness in flexible circuitry applications. Kapton E offers reduced coefficient of thermal expansion (CTE), reduced moisture absorption, and reduced coefficient of hygroscopic expansion (CHE) compared to Kapton H.

== Characteristics ==
In isolation, Kapton remains stable across a wide range of temperatures, from 4 to 673 K (−269 to +400 °C).

The thermal conductivity of Kapton at temperatures from 0.5 to 5 Kelvin is rather high for such low temperatures, κ = 4.638×10^{−3} T^{0.5678} W·m^{−1}·K^{−1}.

Kapton insulation ages poorly: an FAA study shows degradation in hot, humid environments or in the presence of seawater. It was found to have very poor resistance to mechanical wear, mainly abrasion within cable harnesses due to aircraft movement. Many aircraft models have had to undergo extensive rewiring modifications—sometimes completely replacing all the Kapton-insulated wiring—because of short circuits caused by the faulty insulation. Kapton-wire degradation and chafing due to vibration and heat has been implicated in multiple crashes of both fixed wing and rotary wing aircraft, with loss of life. The New York Times, citing a NASA OIG document, reported in 2005 that Kapton-insulated cables on the Space Shuttle "tended to break down over time, causing short circuits and, potentially, fires." The STS-93 mission saw electrical shorts on Kapton insulation that disabled two engine controllers and nearly caused a catastrophe.

== Usage ==
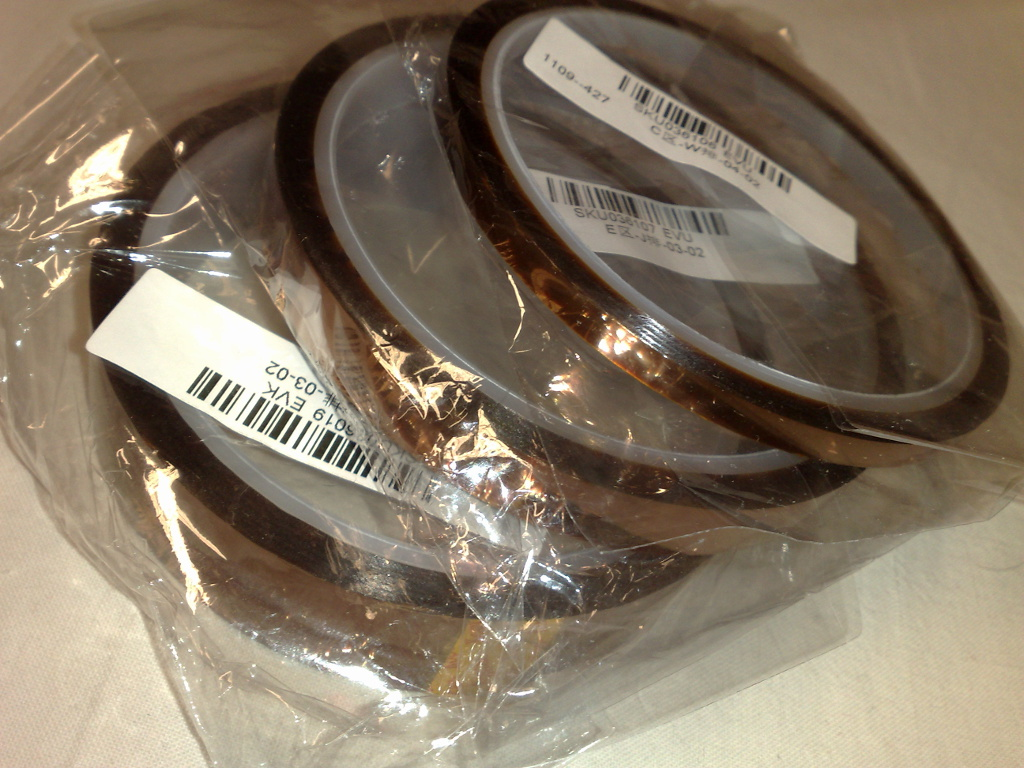
Kapton tapes, three rolls of different widths

=== Electronics manufacturing ===
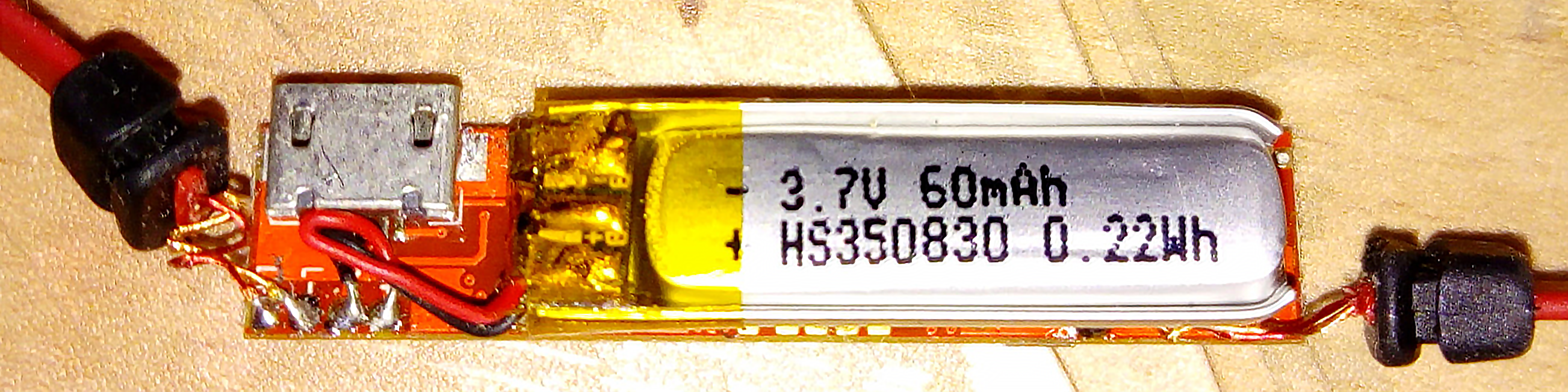
Kapton tape (yellow) used to insulate the leads of a battery cell in a bluetooth headset

Due to its large range of temperature stability and its electrical isolation ability, Kapton tape is usually used in electronic manufacturing as an insulation and protection layer on electrostatic-sensitive and fragile components. As it can sustain the temperature needed for a reflow soldering operation, its protection is available throughout the whole production process, and Kapton is often still present in the final consumer product.

=== Spacecraft ===
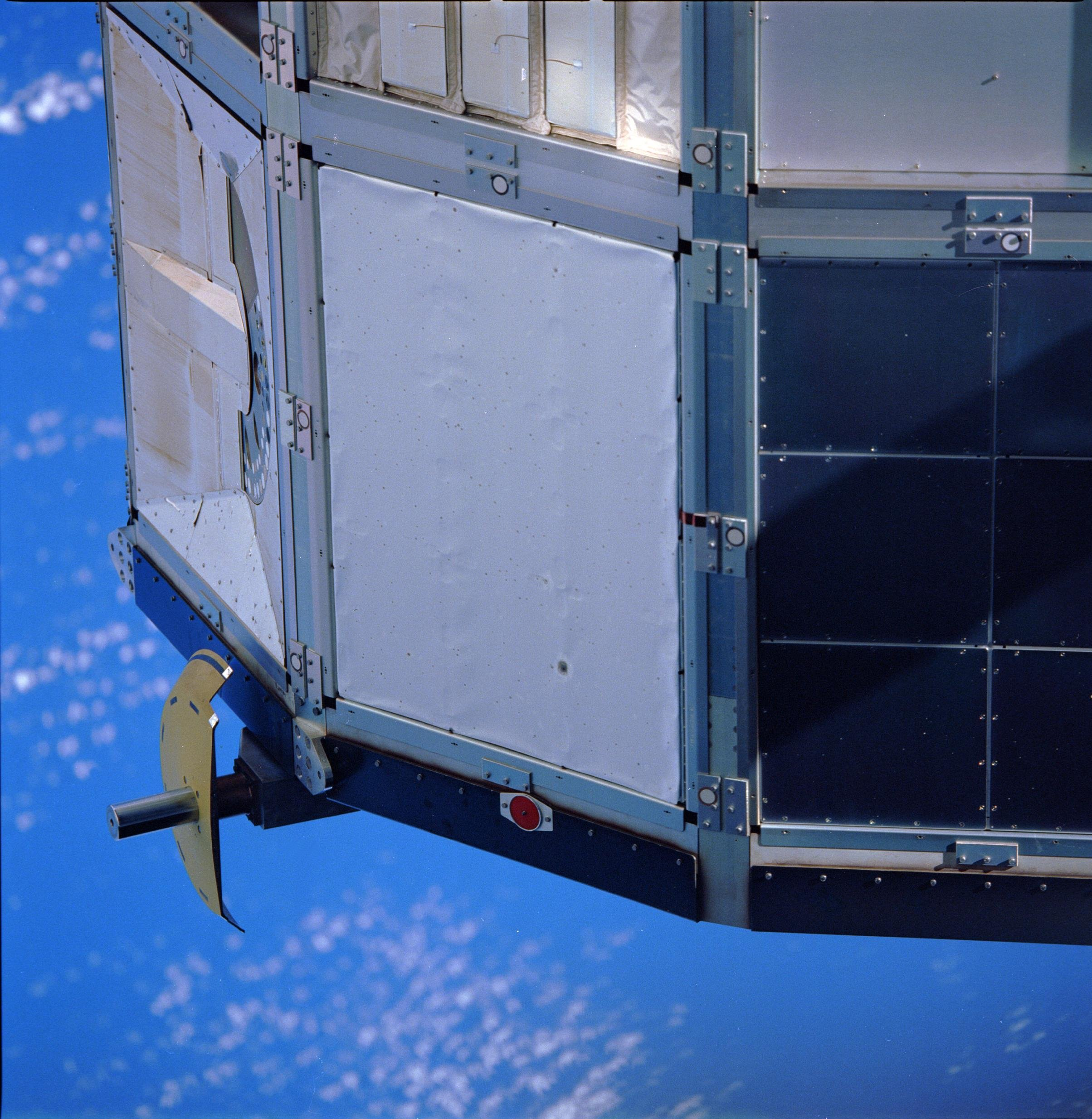
Aluminized Kapton thermal cover was used on the Ultra Heavy Cosmic Ray Experiment.

The descent stage of the Apollo Lunar Module, and the bottom of the ascent stage surrounding the ascent engine, were covered in blankets of aluminized Kapton foil to provide thermal insulation. During the return journey from the Moon, Apollo 11 astronaut Neil Armstrong commented that during the launch of the Lunar Module Eagle ascent stage, he could see "Kapton and other parts of the LM staging scattering all around the area for great distances."

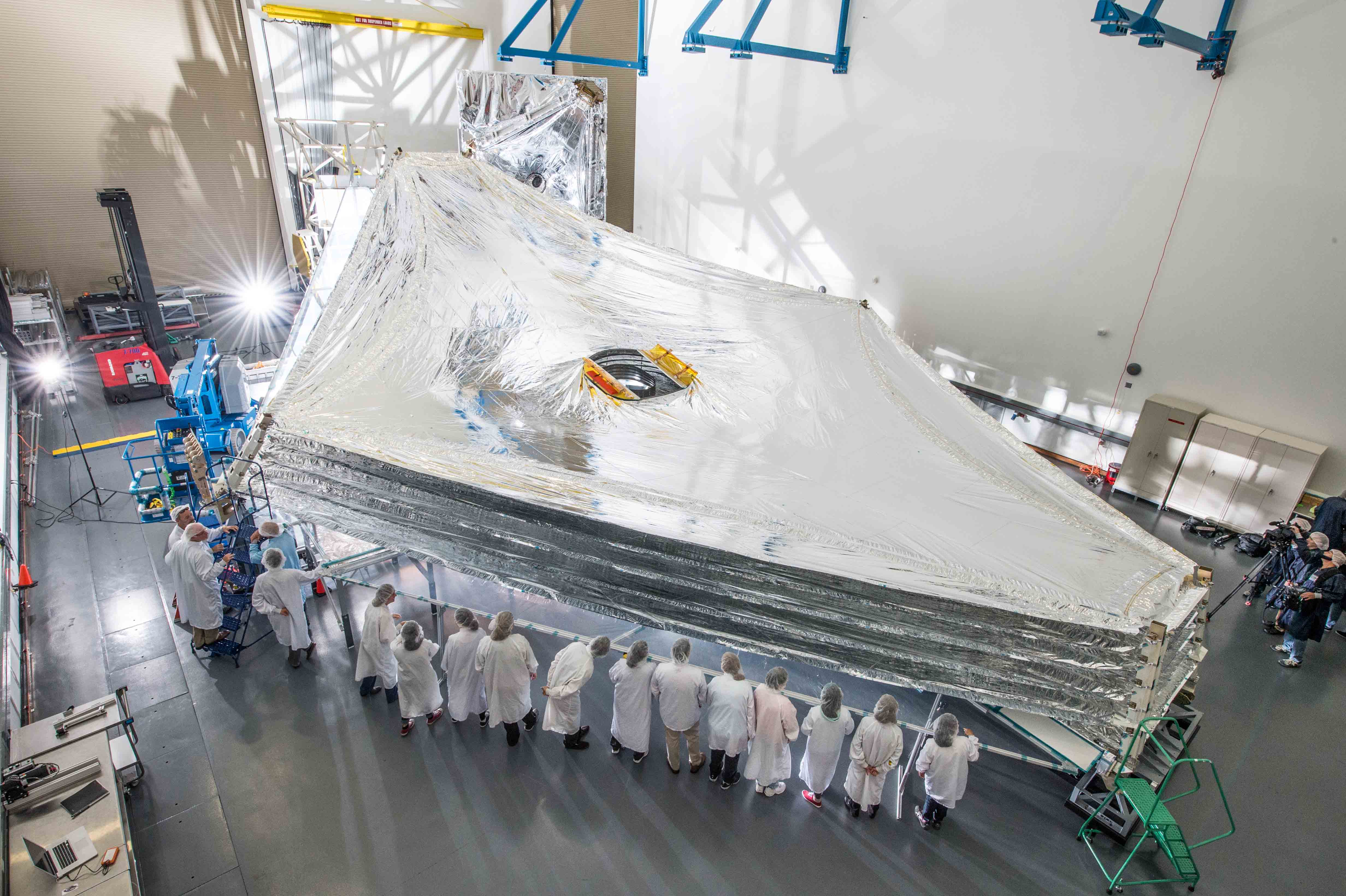
Test unit of the James Webb Space Telescope sunshield, made of aluminized Kapton

The NASA Jet Propulsion Laboratory has considered Kapton as a good plastic support for solar sails because of its durability in the space environment.

NASA's New Horizons spacecraft used Kapton in an innovative "Thermos bottle" insulation design to keep the craft operating between 283 and 303 K (10 and 30 °C) throughout its more than nine-year, 5-terametre (33-astronomical-unit) journey to rendezvous with the dwarf planet Pluto on 14 July 2015. The main body is covered in lightweight, gold-colored, multilayered thermal insulation which holds in heat from operating electronics to keep the spacecraft warm. The thermal blanketing of 18 layers of Dacron mesh cloth sandwiched between aluminized Mylar and Kapton film also helped to protect the craft from micrometeorites.

The James Webb Space Telescope sunshield is made of five Kapton E sheets coated with aluminum and doped silicon to reflect heat away from the spacecraft body.

The crew aboard the International Space Station used Kapton tape to temporarily repair a slow leak in a Soyuz spacecraft attached to the Russian segment of the orbital complex in August 2018. It was used again in October 2020 to temporarily seal a leak in the transfer chamber of the Zvezda Service Module of the ISS.

=== X-rays ===
Kapton is also commonly used as a material for windows used with all kinds of X-ray sources (synchrotron beam-lines and X-ray tubes) and X-ray detectors. Its high mechanical and thermal stability as well as high transmittance of X-rays make it the preferred material. It is also relatively resistant to radiation damage.

=== 3D printing ===
Kapton and ABS adhere to each other very well, which has led to widespread use of Kapton as a build surface for 3D printers. Kapton is laid down on a flat surface and the ABS is extruded onto the Kapton surface. The ABS part being printed will not detach from the build platform as it cools and shrinks, a common cause of print failure by warping of the part. A more durable alternative is to use a polyetherimide surface.

Researchers have devised a method to 3D-print polyimide material including Kapton. The polyamic acid precursor to Kapton is mixed with an acrylate cross linker and photoinitiator that can form a gel when exposed to ultraviolet light during 3D printing. Subsequent heating of the 3D printed part up to 400 °C removes the sacrificial crosslinks and imidizes the part forming Kapton with a 3D printed geometry.

=== Others ===
Kapton's relatively high thermal conductivity at very low temperatures, together with its good dielectric qualities and its availability as thin sheets, have made it a favorite material in cryogenics, as it provides electrical insulation at low thermal gradients.

Kapton is regularly used as an insulator in ultra-high-vacuum environments due to its low outgassing rate.

Kapton-insulated electrical wiring has been widely used in civil and military aircraft because it is lighter than other insulators and has good insulating and temperature characteristics.

== See also ==
- Mylar
