= Pyromellitic dianhydride =

Names
- Preferred IUPAC name 1H,3H-Benzo[1,2-c:4,5-c′]difuran-1,3,5,7-tetrone

Identifiers
CAS Number	89-32-7
3D model (JSmol)	Interactive image
ChemSpider	21106533
ECHA InfoCard	100.001.726
EC Number	201-898-9
PubChem CID	6966
RTECS number	DB9300000
UNII	2Z22T30QZQ
CompTox Dashboard (EPA)	DTXSID1026536
- InChI: InChI=1S/C10H2O6/c11-7-3-1-4-6(10(14)16-8(4)12)2-5(3)9(13)15-7/h1-2H Key: ANSXAPJVJOKRDJ-UHFFFAOYSA-N
- SMILES: C1=C2C(=CC3=C1C(=O)OC3=O)C(=O)OC2=O

Properties
Chemical formula	C_{10}H_{2}O_{6}
Molar mass	218.120 g·mol^{−1}
Appearance	White solid
Density	1.68 g/cm^{3}
Melting point	283 to 286 °C (541 to 547 °F; 556 to 559 K)
Boiling point	397 to 400 °C (747 to 752 °F; 670 to 673 K)
Solubility in water	Hygroscopic

Hazards
- GHS labelling
Pictograms	(GHS05: Corrosive) (GHS07: Exclamation mark) (GHS08: Health hazard)
Signal word	Danger
Hazard statements	H317, H318, H334
Precautionary statements	P261, P272, P280, P285, P302+P352, P304+P341, P305+P351+P338, P310, P321, P333+P313, P342+P311, P363, P501
- Except where otherwise noted, data are given for materials in their standard state (at 25 °C [77 °F], 100 kPa). Infobox references

Pyromellitic dianhydride (PMDA) is an organic compound with the formula C_{6}H_{2}(C_{2}O_{3})_{2}. It is the double carboxylic acid anhydride that is used in the preparation of polyimide polymers such as Kapton. It is a white, hygroscopic solid. It forms a hydrate.

== Preparation ==
It is prepared by gas-phase oxidation of 1,2,4,5-tetramethylbenzene (or related tetrasubstituted benzene derivatives). An idealized equation is:

C_{6}H_{2}(CH_{3})_{4} + 6 O_{2} → C_{6}H_{2}(C_{2}O_{3})_{2} + 6 H_{2}O

In the laboratory, it can be prepared by dehydration of pyromellitic acid using acetic anhydride.

== Reactions ==
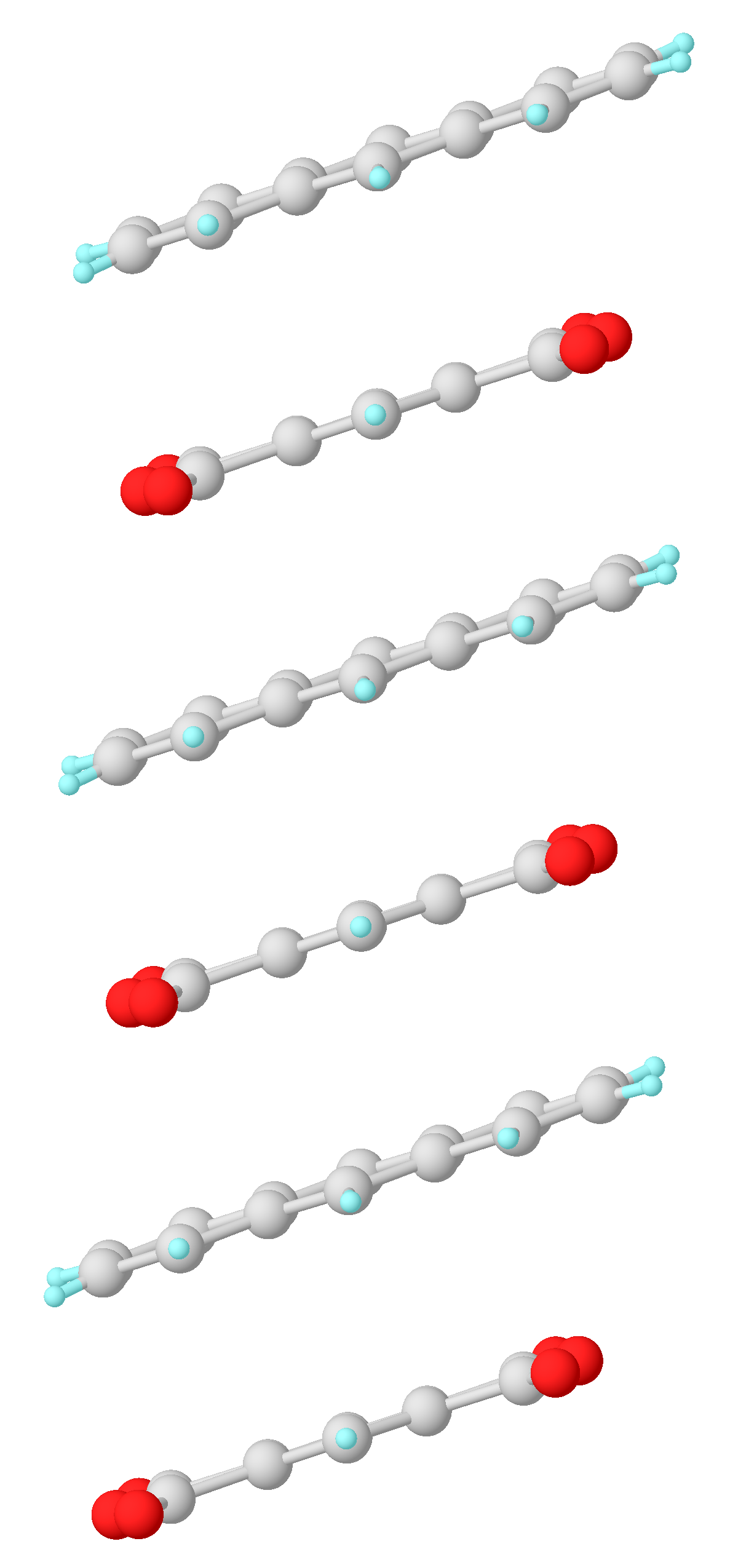
Structure of the complex formed upon co-crystallization of pyromellitic anhydride (molecules terminated in red) and anthracene.

PMDA is an electron-acceptor, forming a variety of charge-transfer complexes. It reacts with amines to diimides, C_{6}H_{2}[(CO)_{2}NR]_{2} which also have acceptor properties.

== Applications ==
PMDA is used in PET bottle recycling as a chain extender. It increases the molecular weight of the polymer by linking-together alcohol and carboxylic acid groups formed by hydrolysis of the PET. This improves the rheological properties and overall quality of the recycled plastic.

PMDA is used in the synthesis of A-317491.

== Safety ==
Evidence suggests that PMDA causes occupational asthma.
