= James Webb Space Telescope sunshield =

Main cooling system for the infrared observatory

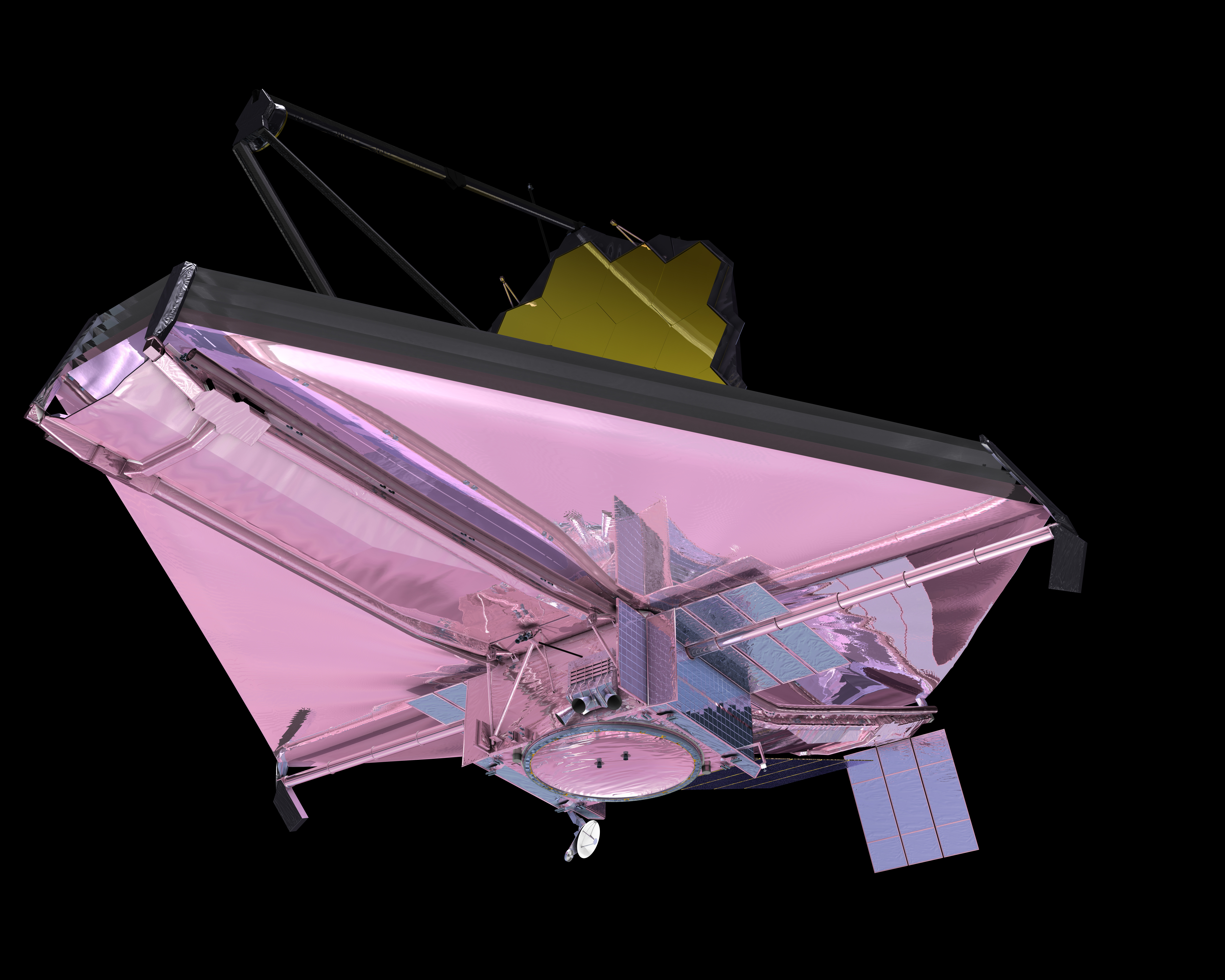
Illustration of the deployed "hot" side of the James Webb Space Telescope with the sunshield protecting the main optics from sunlight

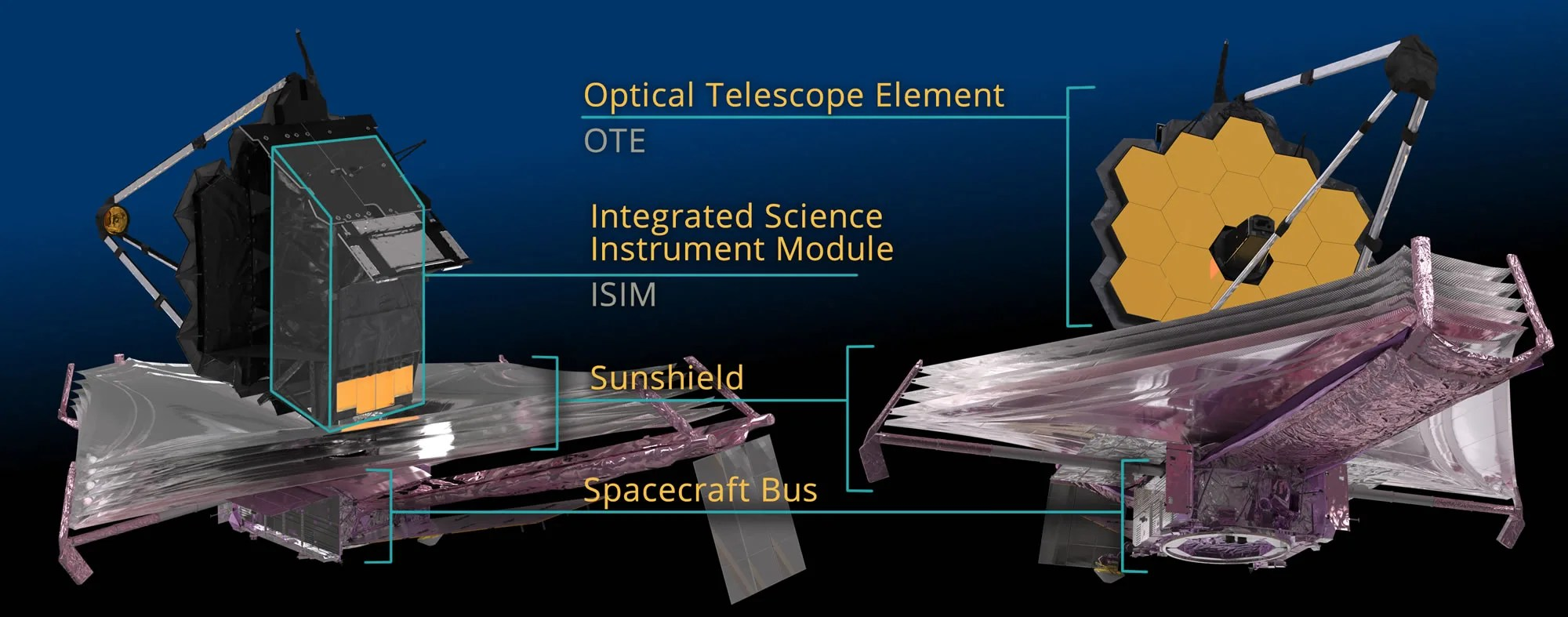
JWST major components: spacecraft bus, sunshield, Optical Telescope Element (OTE) and the Integrated Science Instrument Module (ISIM)

The James Webb Space Telescope (JWST) sunshield is a passive thermal control system deployed post-launch to shield the telescope and instrumentation from the light and heat of the Sun, Earth, and Moon. By keeping the telescope and instruments in permanent shadow, it allows them to cool to their design temperature of 40 kelvins (−233 °C; −388 °F). Its intricate deployment was successfully completed on January 4, 2022, ten days after launch, when it was more than 0.8 million kilometers (500,000 mi) away from Earth.

The JWST sunshield is about 21 m × 14 m (69 ft × 46 ft), roughly the size of a tennis court, and is too big to fit in any existing rocket. Therefore, it was folded up to fit within the fairing of the launch rocket and was deployed post-launch, unfolding five layers of metal-coated plastic. The first layer is the largest, and each consecutive layer decreases in size. Each layer is made of a thin (50 microns for the first layer, 25 microns for the others) Kapton membrane coated with aluminum for reflectivity. The outermost Sun-facing layers have a doped-silicon coating which gives it a purple color, toughens the shield, and helps it reflect heat. The thickness of the aluminum coating is approximately 100 nanometers, and the silicon coating is even thinner at approximately 50 nanometers. The sunshield segment includes the layers and its deployment mechanisms, which also includes the trim flap.

== Overview ==
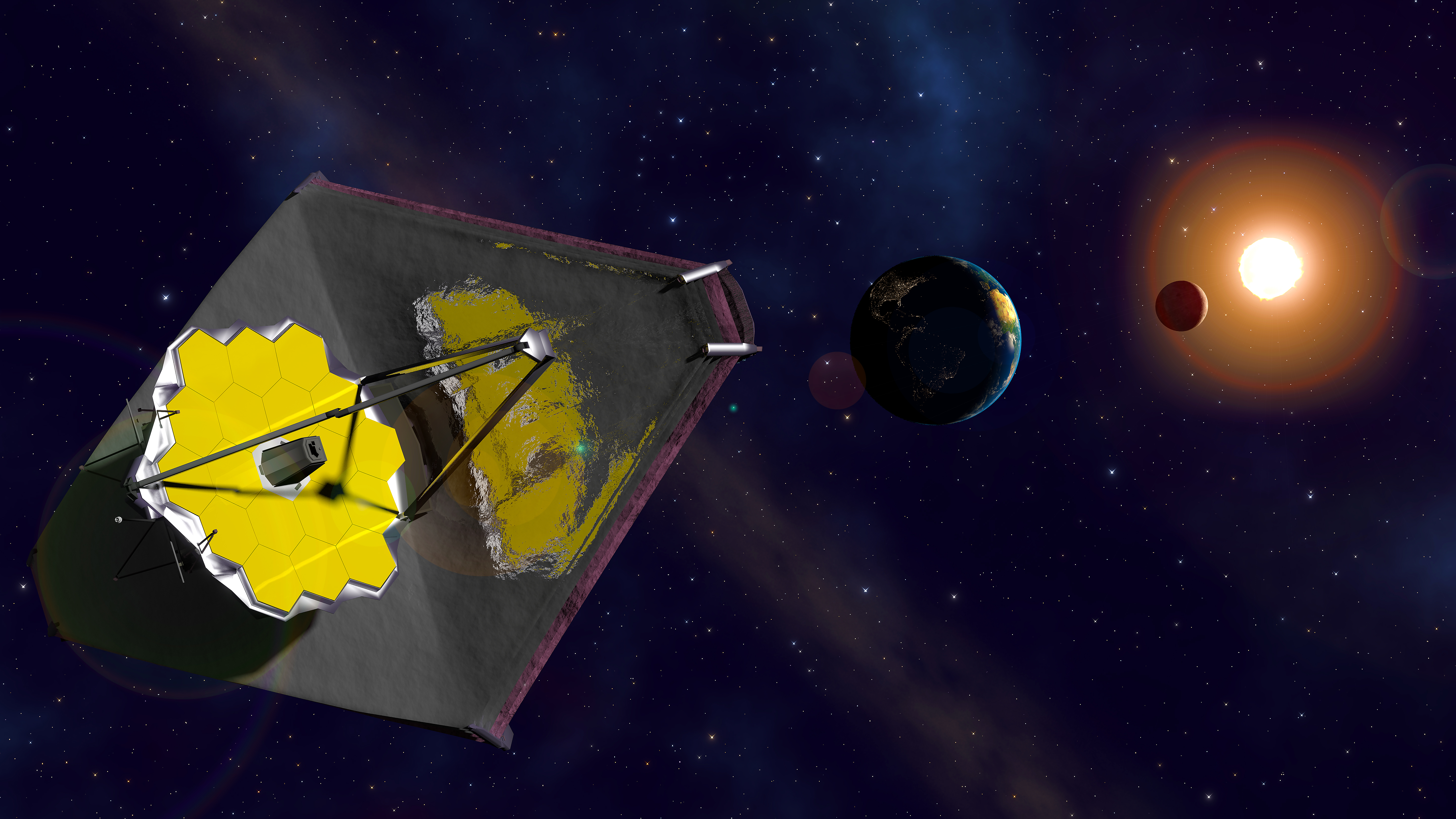
In this artist's view (not to scale), a stylized portrayal of the orientation of the telescope shows how the sunshield blocks sunlight from heating the main mirror.

To make observations in the near and mid infrared spectrum, the JWST must be kept very cold (under 50 K (−223 °C; −370 °F), some parts under 40K), otherwise infrared radiation from the telescope itself would overwhelm its instruments. Therefore, it uses a large sunshield to block light and heat from the Sun, Earth, and Moon, and its position near the Sun-Earth L_{2} Lagrange point keeps all three bodies on the same side of the spacecraft at all times. Its halo orbit around L_{2} avoids the shadow of the Earth and Moon, maintaining a constant environment for the sunshield and solar arrays.

Infrared is heat radiation. In order to see the faint glow of infrared heat from distant stars and galaxies, the telescope has to be very cold. If sunlight or the warm glow of the Earth heated the telescope, the infrared light emitted by the telescope would outshine its targets, and it wouldn't be able to see anything.

— NASA Deputy Senior Project Scientist for the Webb Telescope at Goddard, 2008

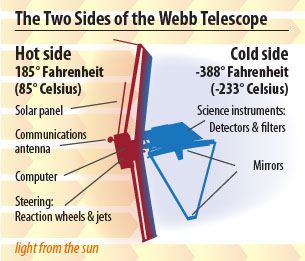
The temperature differences between the hot and cold sides of the James Webb Space Telescope five-layer sunshield

The sunshield acts as large parasol allowing the main mirror, optics, and instruments to passively cool to 40 kelvins (−233 °C; −388 °F) or cooler, and is one of the enabling technologies that will allow the JWST to operate. The kite-shaped sunshield is about 21 by 14 metres (69 by 46 ft) in size, big enough to shade the main mirror and secondary mirror, leaving only one instrument, the MIRI (Mid-Infrared Instrument), in need of extra cooling. The sunshield acts as a V-groove radiator and causes a temperature drop of 318 K (318 °C, 604 °F) from front to back. In operation the shield will receive about 200 kilowatts of solar radiation, but only pass 23 milliwatts to the other side.

The sunshield has five layers to mitigate the conduction of heat. These layers are made of the polyimide film Kapton E, which is stable from −269 to 400 °C (−450 to 750 °F). However the thin films are delicate – accidental tears during testing in 2018 were among the factors delaying the JWST project, and Kapton is known to degrade after long term exposure to Earth conditions. The sun-facing layer is .05 mm (0.002 in) thick, and the other layers are .025 mm (0.001 in) thick. All layers are coated on both sides with 100 nm of aluminum, and the Sun-facing sides of the outermost two layers are also coated with 50 nm of silicon "doped" with other elements. This helps the material survive in space, radiate excess heat, and to conduct electricity, so a static charge does not build up on the layers.

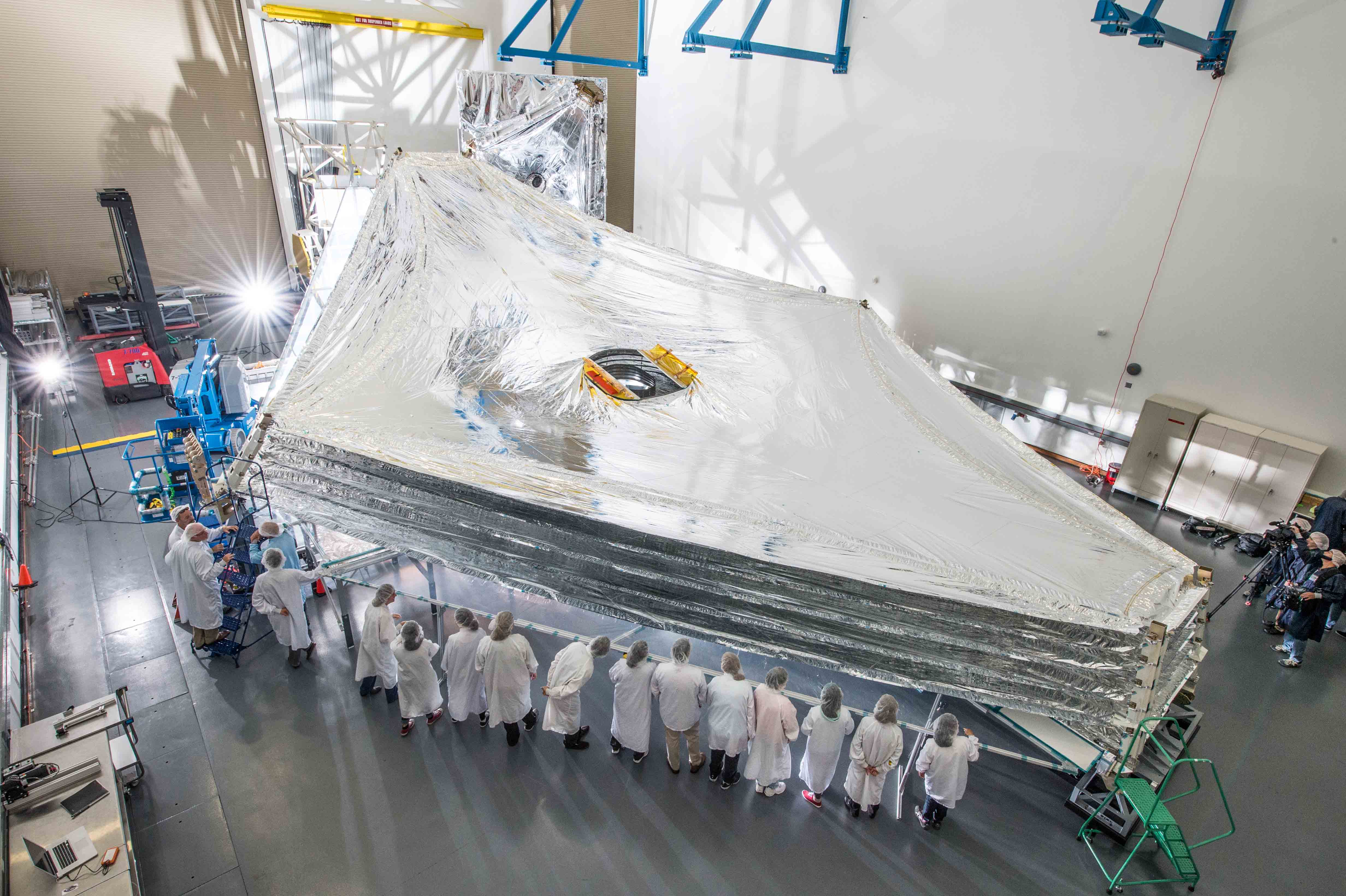
Test unit of the sunshield stacked and expanded at the Northrop Grumman facility in California, 2014

Each layer has a slightly different shape and size. Layer 5 is the closest to the primary mirror and is the smallest. Layer 1 is closest to the Sun and is bigger and flatter. The first layer blocks 90% of the heat, and each successive layer blocks more heat, which is reflected out the sides. The sunshield allows the optics to stay in shadow for pitch angles of +5° to −45° and roll angles of +5° to −5°. The layers are designed with Thermal Spot Bond (TSB), with a grid pattern bonded to each layer at intervals. This helps stop a rip or hole from increasing in size should one occur.

== Design and manufacture ==
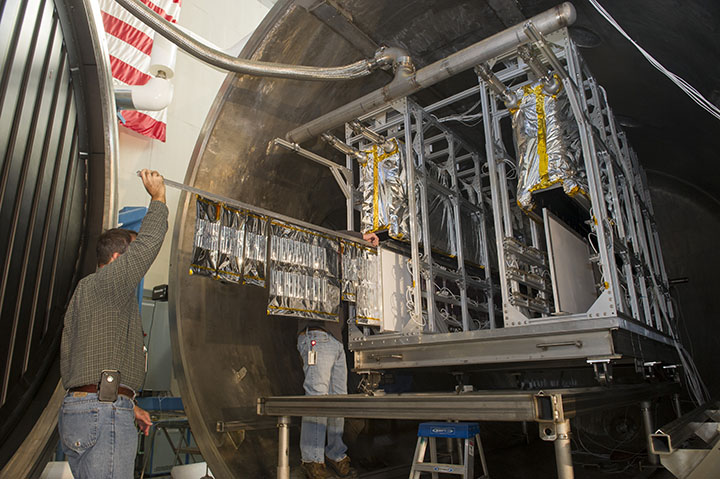
Coupons of Sunshield test fabric being tested to see how they perform, 2012

Northrop Grumman designed the sunshield for NASA. The sunshield is designed to be folded twelve times so it can fit within the Ariane 5 rocket's 4.57 m (15.0 ft) diameter by 16.19 m (53.1 ft) shroud. When it deployed at the L2 point, it unfolded to 21.197 m × 14.162 m (69.54 ft × 46.46 ft). The sunshield was hand-assembled at ManTech (NeXolve) in Huntsville, Alabama before it was delivered to Northrop Grumman in Redondo Beach, California for testing. During launch it was wrapped around the Optical Telescope Element and then later unfolded. The sunshield was planned to be unfolded approximately one week after launch. During development the sunshield layer material was tested with heat, cold, radiation, and high-velocity micro impacts.

Components of the sunshield include:

- Core
- Front and aft four-bar linkage
- Aft structure assembly
  - Momentum trim tab (the tab is attached to the aft structure assembly)
  - Aft spreader bars (spreads layers in the rear)
- Forward structure assembly
  - Forward spreader bars
- Mid-booms (one on each side)
  - Mid-spreader bars (spreads the 5 layers apart)
- Two forward and two aft bipod launch lock assemblies

The bipod launch lock assemblies are where the sunshield segment connected to the OTE when it was folded up during launch. There are six spreader bars that expanded to separate the layers of the sunshield, which has roughly six sides.

=== Trim flap/momentum trim tab ===
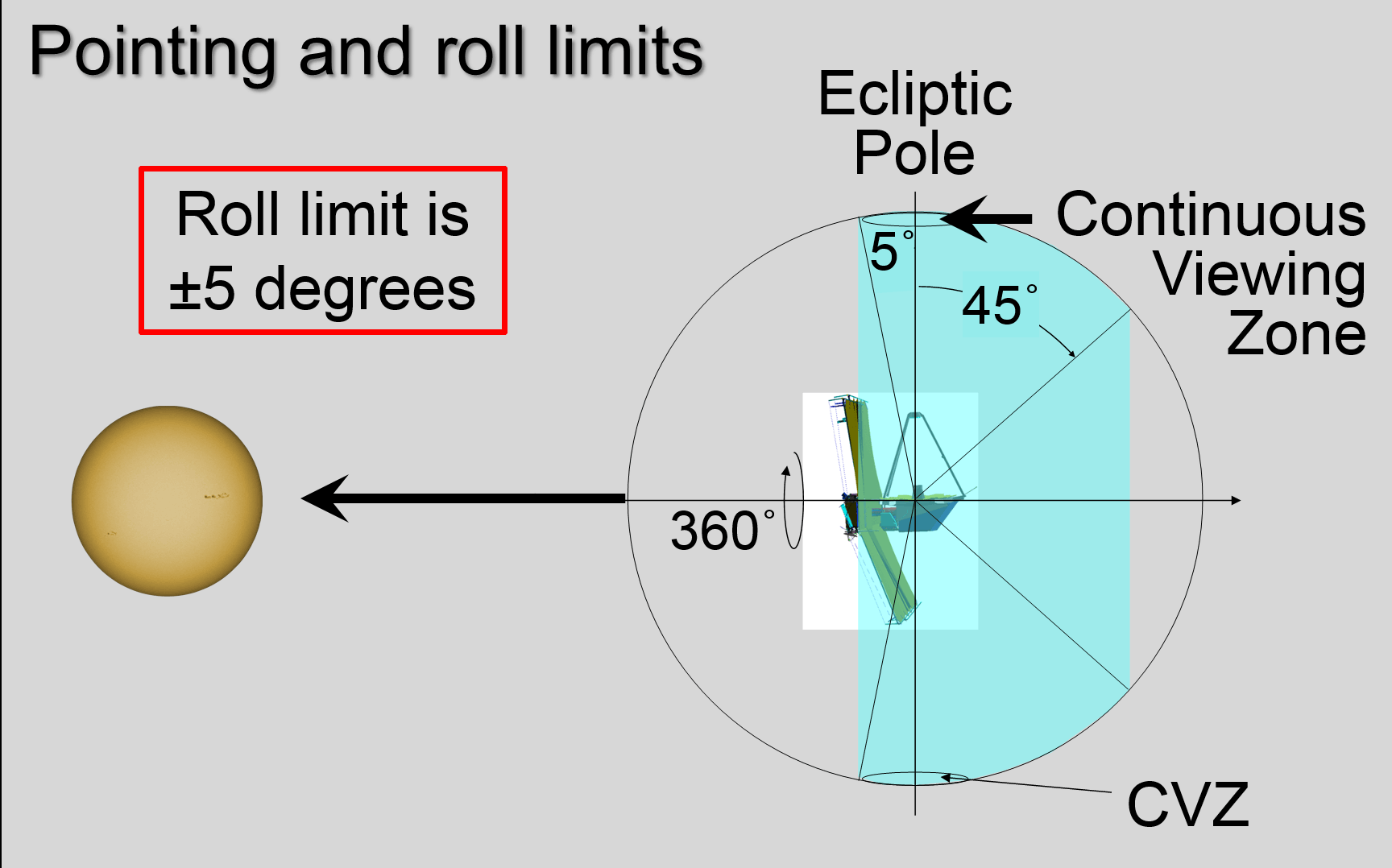
Diagram of roll limits and how they impact pointing

The sunshield segment also includes a trim flap at the end of a sunshield deployment boom. This is also called the momentum trim tab. The trim tab helps balance out solar pressure caused by photons striking the sunshield. If this pressure is uneven, the spacecraft will tend to rotate, requiring its reactions wheels (located in the spacecraft bus) to correct and maintain JWST's orientation in space. The reaction wheels, in turn, will eventually become saturated and require fuel to desaturate, potentially limiting spacecraft lifetime. The trim tab, by helping keep the pressure balanced and hence limiting fuel usage, extends the working life of the telescope.

=== Layers ===
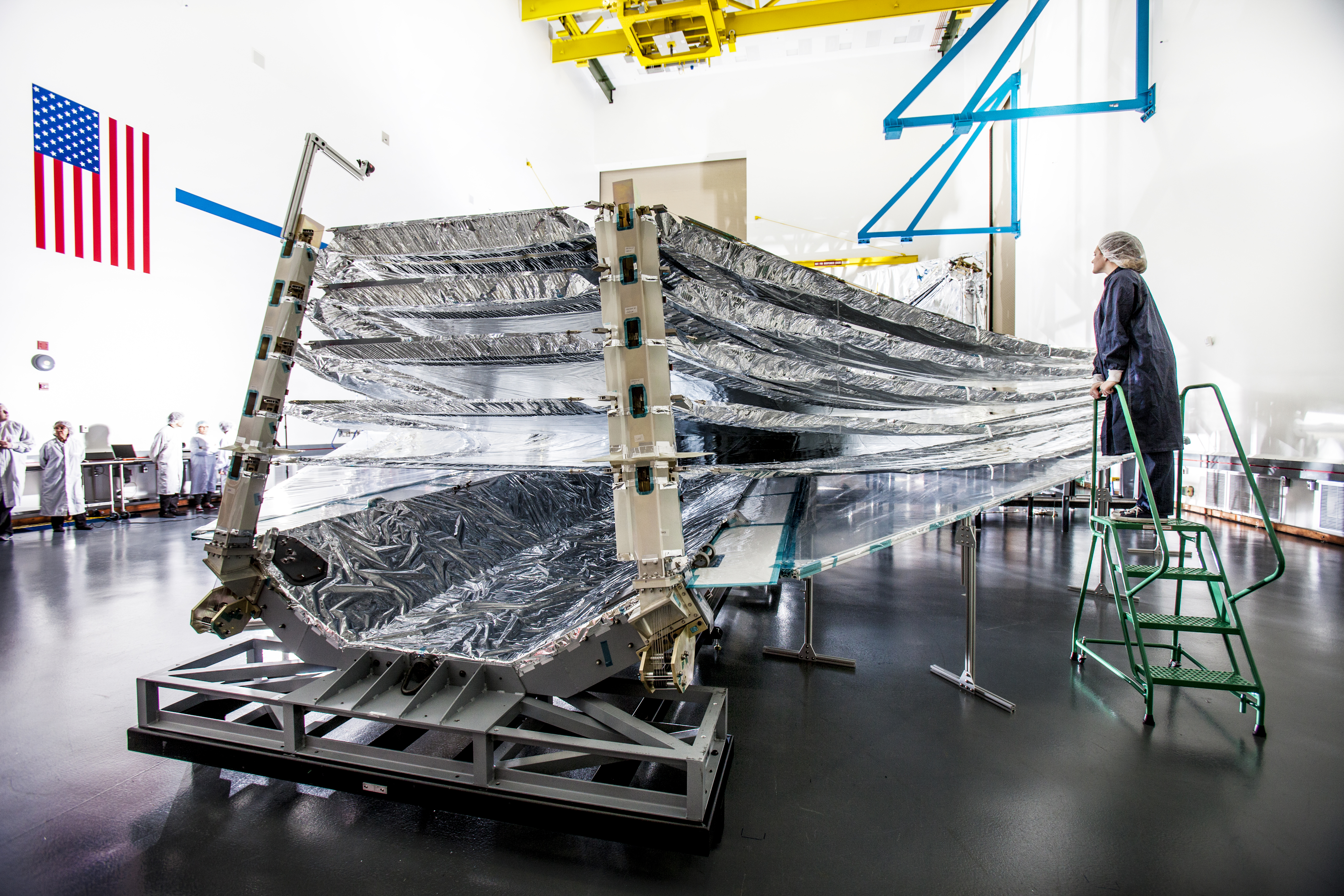
The five layers of the JWST sunshield being tested in 2013

The layers are designed so the Sun, Earth, and Moon shine on layer one almost exclusively, sometimes a tiny portion of layer two, and on the other side that the telescope elements only see layer five and sometimes a tiny amount of layer four. The separation between layers, in the vacuum of space, prevents heat transfer by conduction and aids in radiating heat out of the way. Silicon doping of the material causes the purple hue.

== Deployment ==
Animation sequence for the deployment of the sunshield. To see how the sunshield deployment fits within the entire sequence of deployments on the spacecraft, see this animation.

The sunshield component attaches to the main spacecraft, and its booms expand outward spreading out the heat shield and separating the layers. During launch the shield is folded up; later, when it is in space, it is carefully unfurled. When the sunshield is fully spread open, it is 14.6 meters (48 ft) wide by 21.1 meters (69 ft) long. When the layers are fully open, they are opened wider at the edges which helps reflect heat out.

Sunshield deployment structure/devices include:

- telescoping booms
  - stem deployers
- spreader bars
- cable drives

There are two stem deployers inside the telescoping booms. These are special electrical motors that, when operated, extended the telescopic boom, pulling out the folded sunshield. The telescopic booms are called the MBA, or mid-boom assemblies. At the end of each MBA is a spreader bar.

After a successful launch on 2021 December 25 from the Guiana Space Center, the post-launch deployment of the JWST sunshield proceeded as follows.

On December 31, 2021, the ground team at the Space Telescope Science Institute in Baltimore, Maryland began the deployment of the two telescoping "mid-booms" from the left and right sides of the observatory, pulling the five sunshield membranes out of their folded stowage in the fore and aft pallets, which were lowered three days earlier. Deployment of the left side boom (in relation to pointing direction of the main mirror) was delayed when mission control did not initially receive confirmation that the sunshield cover had fully rolled up. After looking at extra data for confirmation, the team proceeded to extend the booms. The left side deployed in 3 hours and 19 minutes; the right side took 3 hours and 42 minutes. With that step, Webb's sunshield resembled its complete, kite-shaped form and extended to its full 47-foot width. Commands to separate and tension the membranes were to follow.

After taking New Year's Day off, the ground team delayed sunshield tensioning by one day to allow time to optimize the power output of the observatory's array of solar panels and to adjust the orientation of the observatory to cool the slightly-hotter-than-expected sunshield deployment motors. Tensioning of layer one, closest to the Sun and largest of the five in the sunshield, began on 2022 January 3 and was completed at 3:48 p.m. EST. Tensioning of the second and third layers began at 4:09 p.m. EST and took 2 hours and 25 minutes. On January 4, 2022, controllers successfully tensioned the last two layers, four and five, completing the task of deploying the JWST sunshield at 11:59 a.m. EST.

== Timeline ==
- 2007 or before, Technology Readiness Level (TRL) 6 achieved for the sunshield membrane.
- 2016 September 11, first layer of sunshield completed.
- 2016 November 2, the final fifth layer is completed.
- 2018 March 27, NASA announced the presence of tears in the sunshield, contributing to launch delays.
- 2021 December 25, successful launching of the James Webb Space Telescope from the Guiana Space Center.
- 2021 December 31, initial deployment of the telescoping booms to support and unfurl the sunshield.
- 2022 January 3, initial tensioning and separating of the first three layers of the sunshield.
- 2022 January 4, completion of tensioning/separating all five layers and the successful deployment of the JWST sunshield, ten days after launch and more than 0.8 million kilometers (500,000 mi) away from Earth.

== See also ==
- Heat shield
- Insulation
- New Worlds Mission (also blocks sunlight, but for observing exoplanets obscured by their bright parent star)
- Skylab (also used deployed expanding fabric/layer sun-shield in the 1970s)
- Spacecraft thermal control
- Timeline of the James Webb Space Telescope
