= Vespel =

DuPont high-performance plastics brand

Structure of a Vespel polymer

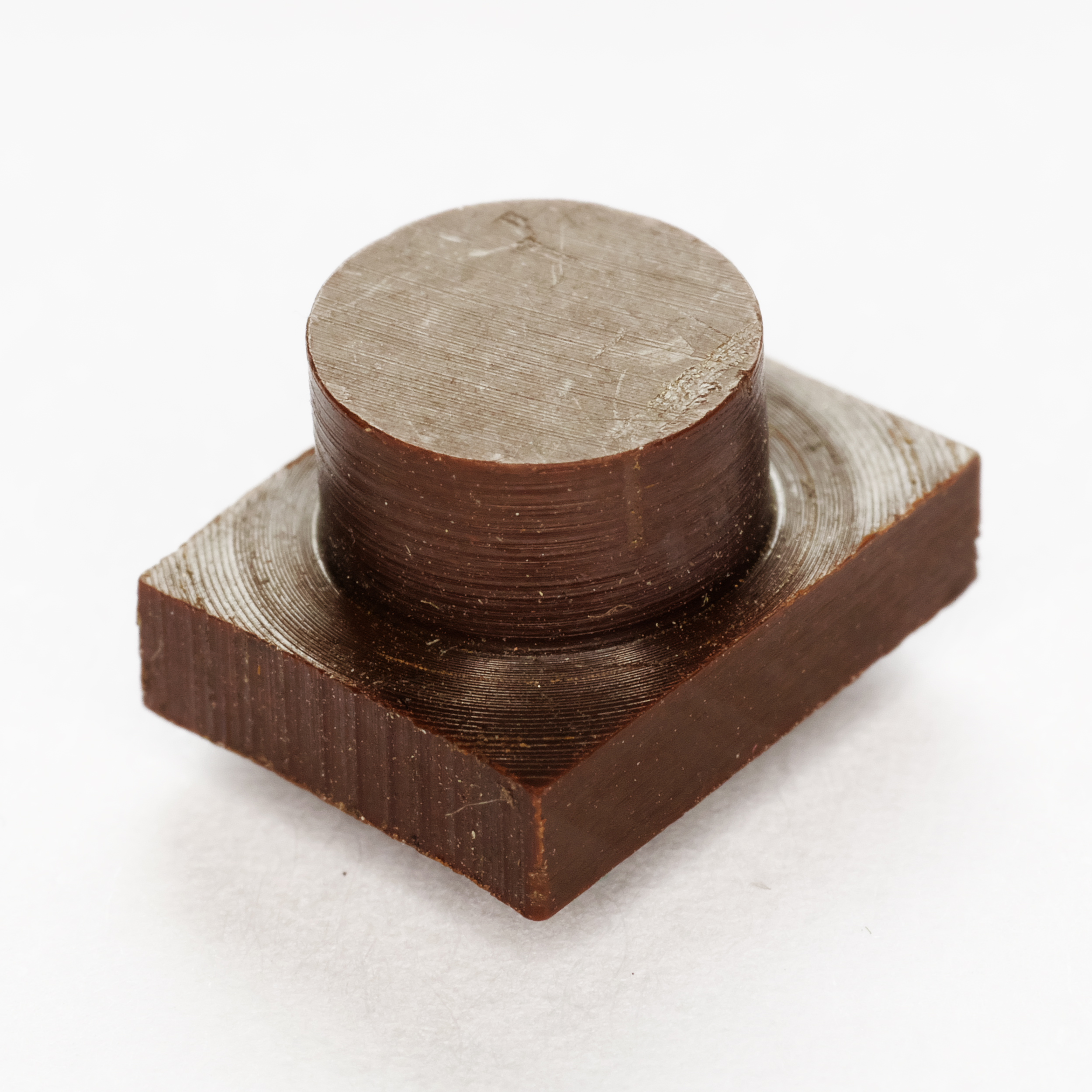
Sawn and turned workpiece made from Vespel

Vespel is the trademark of a range of durable high-performance polyimide-based plastics made by DuPont.

== Characteristics and applications ==
Vespel is mostly used in aerospace, semiconductor, and transportation technology. It combines heat resistance, lubricity, dimensional stability, chemical resistance, and creep resistance, and can be used in hostile and extreme environmental conditions.

Unlike most plastics, it does not produce significant outgassing even at high temperatures, which makes it useful for lightweight heat shields and crucible support. It also performs well in vacuum applications, down to extremely low cryogenic temperatures. However, Vespel tends to absorb a small amount of atmospheric moisture, resulting in longer pump time while placed in a vacuum.

Although there are polymers surpassing polyimide in each of these properties, the combination of them is the main advantage of Vespel.

Vespel is also notorious for its high cost.

== Thermophysical properties ==
Vespel is commonly used as a thermal conductivity reference material for testing thermal insulators, because of high reproducibility and consistency of its thermophysical properties. For example, it can withstand repeated heating up to 300 °C without altering its thermal and mechanical properties. Extensive tables of measured thermal diffusivity, specific heat capacity, and derived density, all as functions of temperature, have been published.

== Magnetic properties ==
Vespel is used in high-resolution probes for NMR spectroscopy because its volume magnetic susceptibility (−9.02 ± 0.25×10^{−6} for Vespel SP-1 at 21.8 °C) is close to that of water at room temperature (−9.03×10^{−6} at 20 °C) Negative values indicate that both substances are diamagnetic. Matching volume magnetic susceptibilities of materials surrounding NMR sample to that of the solvent can reduce susceptibility broadening of magnetic resonance lines.

== Processing for manufacturing applications ==
Vespel can be processed by direct forming (DF) and isostatic molding (basic shapes – plates, rods and tubes). For prototype quantities, basic shapes are typically used for cost efficiency since tooling is quite expensive for DF parts. For large-scale CNC production, DF parts are often used to reduce per-part costs, at the expense of material properties which are inferior to those of isostatically produced basic shapes.

== Types ==
For different applications, special formulations are blended/compounded. Shapes are produced by three standard processes:

1. compression molding (for plates and rings);
2. isostatic molding (for rods); and
3. direct forming (for small size parts produced in large volumes).

Direct-formed parts have lower performance characteristics than parts that have been machined from compression-molded or isostatic shapes. Isostatic shapes have isotropic physical properties, whereas direct-formed and compression-molded shapes exhibit anisotropic physical properties.

Some examples of standard polyimide compounds are:

SP-1 virgin polyimide
provides operating temperatures from cryogenic to 300 °C (570 °F), high plasma resistance, as well as a UL rating for minimal electrical and thermal conductivity. This is the unfilled base polyimide resin. It also provides high physical strength and maximal elongation, and the best electrical and thermal insulation values. Example: Vespel SP-1.
15% graphite by weight, SP-21
added to the base resin for increased wear resistance and reduced friction in applications such as plain bearings, thrust washers, seal rings, slide blocks and other wear applications. This compound has the best mechanical properties of the graphite-filled grades, but lower than the virgin grade. Example: Vespel SP-21.
40% graphite by weight, SP-22
for enhanced wear resistance, lower friction, improved dimensional stability (low coefficient of thermal expansion), and stability against oxidation. Example: Vespel SP-22.
10% PTFE and 15% graphite by weight, SP-211
added to the base resin for the lowest coefficient of friction over a wide range of operating conditions. It also has excellent wear resistance up to 149 °C (300 °F). Typical applications include sliding or linear bearings as well as many wear and friction uses listed above. Example: Vespel SP-211.
15% moly-filled (molybdenum disulfide solid lubricant), SP-3
for wear and friction resistance in vacuum and other moisture-free environments where graphite actually becomes abrasive. Typical applications include seals, plain bearings, gears, and other wear surfaces in outer space, ultra-high vacuum or dry-gas applications. Example: Vespel SP-3.

== Material properties data ==
Material properties of Vespel (produced by isostatic molding and machining)
Property	Units	Test condition	SP-1 (unfilled)	SP-21 (15% graphite)	SP-22 (40% graphite)	SP-211 (10% PTFE, 15% graphite)	SP-3 (15% MoS_{2})
Specific gravity	dimensionless		1.43	1.51	1.65	1.55	1.60
Thermal expansion coefficient	10^{−6}/K	211–296 K	45	34	27		
Thermal expansion coefficient	10^{−6}/K	296–573 K	54	49	38	54	52
Thermal conductivity	W/m·K	at 313 K	0.35	0.87	1.73	0.76	0.47
Volume resistivity	Ω·m	at 296 K	10^{14}–10^{15}	10^{12}–10^{13}			
Dielectric constant	dimensionless	at 100 Hz	3.62	13.53			
Dielectric constant	dimensionless	at 10 kHz	3.64	13.28			
Dielectric constant	dimensionless	at 1 MHz	3.55	13.41			
