= Corrosion in space =

Corrosion of materials occurring in outer space

Corrosion in space is the corrosion of materials occurring in outer space. Instead of moisture and oxygen acting as the primary corrosion causes, the materials exposed to outer space are subjected to vacuum, bombardment by ultraviolet and X-rays, solar energetic particles (mostly electrons and protons from solar wind), and electromagnetic radiation. In the upper layers of the atmosphere (between 90–800 km), the atmospheric atoms, ions, and free radicals, most notably atomic oxygen, play a major role. The concentration of atomic oxygen depends on altitude and solar activity, as the bursts of ultraviolet radiation cause photodissociation of molecular oxygen. Between 160 and 560 km, the atmosphere consists of about 90% atomic oxygen.

== Materials ==
Corrosion in space has the highest impact on spacecraft with moving parts. Early satellites tended to develop problems with seizing bearings. Now the bearings are coated with a thin layer of gold.

Different materials resist corrosion in space differently. Electrolytes in batteries or cooling loops can cause galvanic corrosion, general corrosion, and stress corrosion. Aluminium is slowly eroded by atomic oxygen, while gold and platinum are highly corrosion-resistant. Gold-coated foils and thin layers of gold on exposed surfaces are therefore used to protect the spacecraft from the harsh environment. Thin layers of silicon dioxide deposited on the surfaces can also protect metals from the effects of atomic oxygen; e.g., the Starshine 3 satellite aluminium front mirrors were protected that way. However, the protective layers are subject to erosion by micrometeorites.

Silver builds up a layer of silver oxide, which tends to flake off and has no protective function; such gradual erosion of silver interconnects of solar cells was found to be the cause of some observed in-orbit failures.

Many plastics are considerably sensitive to atomic oxygen and ionizing radiation. Coatings resistant to atomic oxygen are a common protection method, especially for plastics. Silicone-based paints and coatings are frequently employed, due to their excellent resistance to radiation and atomic oxygen. However, the silicone durability is somewhat limited, as the surface exposed to atomic oxygen is converted to silica which is brittle and tends to crack.

== Solving corrosion ==
The process of space corrosion is being actively investigated. One of the efforts aims to design a sensor based on zinc oxide, able to measure the amount of atomic oxygen in the vicinity of the spacecraft; the sensor relies on drop of electrical conductivity of zinc oxide as it absorbs further oxygen.

== Other problems ==
The outgassing of volatile silicones on low Earth orbit devices leads to presence of a cloud of contaminants around the spacecraft. Together with atomic oxygen bombardment, this may lead to gradual deposition of thin layers of carbon-containing silicon dioxide. Their poor transparency is a concern in case of optical systems and solar panels. Deposits of up to several micrometers were observed after 10 years of service on the solar panels of the Mir space station.

Other sources of problems for structures subjected to outer space are erosion and redeposition of the materials by sputtering caused by fast atoms and micrometeoroids. Another major concern, though of non-corrosive kind, is material fatigue caused by cyclical heating and cooling and associated thermal expansion mechanical stresses.

== See also ==
- Space weathering
