= Vacuum engineering =

Vacuum engineering is the field of engineering that deals with the practical use of vacuum in industrial and scientific applications. Vacuum may improve the productivity and performance of processes otherwise carried out at normal air pressure or may make possible processes that could not be done in the presence of air. Vacuum engineering techniques are widely applied in materials processing such as drying or filtering, chemical processing, application of metal coatings to objects, manufacture of electron devices and incandescent lamps, and scientific research. Key developments in modern science owe their roots to exploiting vacuum engineering, be it discovering fundamental physics using particle accelerators (one needs to evacuate the space where elementary particles are made to collide), the advanced analytical equipment used to study physical properties of materials or the vacuum chambers within which cryogenic systems are placed to execute operations in solid-state qubits for quantum computation. Vacuum engineering also has its deep bearings in manufacturing technology.

Vacuum techniques vary depending on the desired vacuum pressure to be achieved. For a "rough" vacuum, over 100 Pascals pressure, conventional methods of analysis, materials, pumps and measuring instruments can be used, whereas ultrahigh vacuum systems use specialized equipment to achieve pressures below one-millionth of one Pascal. At such low pressures, even metals may emit enough gas to cause serious contamination.

== Design and mechanism ==
Vacuum systems usually consist of gauges, vapor jet and pumps, vapor traps and valves along with other extensional piping. A vessel that is operating under vacuum system may be any of these types such as processing tank, steam simulator, particle accelerator, or any other type of space that has an enclosed chamber to maintain the system in less than atmospheric gas pressure. Since a vacuum is created in an enclosed chamber, the consideration of being able to withstand external atmospheric pressure are the usual precaution for this type of design. Along with the effect of buckling or collapsing, the outer shell of vacuum chamber will be carefully evaluated and any sign of deterioration will be corrected by the increase of thickness of the shell itself. The main materials used for vacuum design are usually mild steel, stainless steel, and aluminum. Other sections such as glass are used for gauge glass, view ports, and sometimes electrical insulation. The interior of the vacuum chamber should always be smooth and free of rust and defects. High pressure solvents are usually used to remove any excess oil and contaminants that will negatively affect the vacuum. Because a vacuum chamber is in an enclosed space, only very specific detergents can be used to prevent any hazards or danger during cleaning. Any vacuum chamber should always have a certain number of access and viewing ports. These are usually in the form of a flange connection to the attachment of pumps, piping or any other parts required for system operation. Extremely important is the design of the vacuum chamber's sealing capability. The chamber itself must be airtight to maintain perfect vacuum. This is ensured through the process of leak checking, generally using a mass spectrometer leak detector. All openings and connections are also assembled with o-rings and gaskets to prevent any further possible leakage of air into the system.

== Technology ==
Vacuum engineering uses techniques and equipment that vary depending on the level of vacuum used. Pressure slightly reduced from atmospheric pressure may be used to control airflow in ventilation systems, or in material handling systems. Lower-pressure vacuums may be used in vacuum evaporation in processing of food stuffs without excessive heating. Higher grades of vacuum are used for degassing, vacuum metallurgy, and in the production of light bulbs and cathode ray tubes. So-called "ultrahigh" vacuums are required for certain semiconductor processing; the "hardest" vacuums with the lowest pressure are produced for experiments in physics, where even a few stray atoms of air would interfere with the experiment in progress.

Apparatus used varies with decreasing pressure. Blowers give way to various kinds of reciprocating and rotary pumps. For some important applications, a steam ejector can quickly evacuate a large process vessel to a rough vacuum, sufficient for some processes or as a preliminary to more complete pumping processes. The invention of the Sprengel pump was a critical step in the development of the incandescent light bulb as it allowed creation of a vacuum that was higher than previously available, which extended the life of the bulbs. At higher vacuum levels (lower pressures), diffusion pumps, absorption, cryogenic pumps are used. Pumps are more like "compressors" since they gather the rarefied gases in the vacuum vessel and push them into a much higher pressure, smaller volume, exhaust. A chain of two or more different kinds of vacuum pumps may be used in a vacuum system, with one "roughing" pump removing most of the mass of air from the system, and the additional stages handling relatively smaller amounts of air at lower and lower pressures. In some applications, a chemical element is used to combine with the air remaining in an enclosure after pumping. For example, in electronic vacuum tubes, a metallic "getter" was heated by induction to remove the air left after initial pump down and closure of the tubes. The "getter" would also slowly remove any gas evolved within the tube during its remaining life, maintaining a sufficiently good vacuum.

== Applications ==
Vacuum technology is a method used to evacuate air from a closed volume by creating a pressure differential from the closed volume to some vent, the ultimate vent being the open atmosphere. When using an industrial vacuum system, a vacuum pump or generator creates this pressure differential. A variety of technical inventions were created based on the idea of vacuum discovered during the 17th century. These range from vacuum generation pumps to X-ray tubes, which were later introduced to the medical field for use as sources of X-ray radiation. The vacuum environment has come to play an important role in scientific research as new discoveries are being made by looking back to the fundamentals of pressure. The idea of “perfect vacuum” cannot be realized, but very nearly approximated by the technological discoveries of the early 20th century. Vacuum engineering today uses a range of different material, from aluminum to zirconium and just about everything in between. There may be the popular belief that vacuum technology deals only with valves, flanges, and other vacuum components, but novel scientific discoveries are often made with the assistance of these traditional vacuum technologies, especially in the realm of high-tech. Vacuum engineering is used for compound semiconductors, power devices, memory logic, and photovoltaics.

Another technical invention is the vacuum pump. Such invention is used to remove gas molecules from sealed volume, thus leaving behind a partial vacuum. More than one vacuum pump is used in a single application to create fluent flow. Fluent flow is used to allow a clear path made using vacuum to remove any air molecules in the way of the process. Vacuum will be used in this process to attempt to create a perfect vacuum. A type of vacuum such as partial vacuum can be caused by the usage of positive displacement type pumps. A positive displacement pump is able to transfer gas load from the entrance to the exit port, but due to its design limitation, it can only achieve a relatively low vacuum. In order to reach a higher vacuum, other techniques must be used. Using a series of pumps, such as following up a fast pump down with a positive displacement type pump, will create a much better vacuum than using a single pump. The combination of pumps used is usually determined by the need of vacuum in the system.

== Materials ==
Materials for use in vacuum systems must be carefully evaluated. Many materials have a degree of porosity, which, while unimportant at ordinary pressures, would continually admit minute amounts of air into a vacuum system if incorrectly used. Some items, such as rubber and plastic, give off gases into a vacuum that can contaminate the system. At high and ultrahigh vacuum levels, even metals must be carefully selected - air molecules and moisture can cling to the surface of metals, and any trapped gas within the metal may percolate to the surface under vacuum. In some vacuum systems, a simple coating of low-volatile grease is sufficient to seal gaps in joints, but at ultrahigh vacuum, fittings must be carefully machined and polished to minimize trapped gas. It is usual practice to bake components of a high-vacuum system; at high temperatures, any gases or moisture adhering to the surface are driven off. However, this requirement affects which materials can be used. For low pressure applications, it is possible to post process even 3D-printed plastic to make vacuum systems.

Particle accelerators are the largest ultrahigh vacuum systems and can be up to kilometres in length.

Vacuum systems have been studied for a long time, so the properties of basic materials used in vacuum tubes (carbon, ceramics, copper, glass, graphite, iron, mica, nickel, precious metals, refractory metals, steel, and all relevant alloys) are well understood, including their joining techniques and how to deal with common problems such as secondary emission and voltage breakdown.

== History ==
The word “vacuum” originates from the Latin word “vacua”, meaning “empty”. Physicists use vacuum to describe an empty space, where air or other gases are removed from a container. The idea of vacuum relating to the empty space has been speculated as early as the 5th century Greek philosophers. Aristotle (384-322 B.C.) conceived of vacuum as an empty space that in nature would be impossible to create. This idea had persisted until the 17th century, when vacuum technology and physics was discovered. In the mid 17th century, Evangelista Torricelli studied the properties of a vacuum generated by a mercury column in a glass tube; this became the barometer, an instrument to observe variations in atmospheric air pressure. Otto von Guericke spectacularly demonstrated the effect of atmospheric pressure in 1654, when teams of horses could not separate two 20-inch diameter hemispheres, which had been placed together and evacuated. In 1698, Thomas Savery patented a steam pump that relied on condensation of steam to produce a low-grade vacuum for pumping water out of mines. That apparatus was improved in the Newcomen atmospheric engine of 1712. While inefficient, it allowed practical coal mines that otherwise would flood by ground water. During the years 1564–1642, Galileo was one of the first physicists to conduct experiments to develop measured forces to create vacuum using a piston in a cylinder. This was a significant discovery for science and was shared among others. French scientist and philosopher Blaise Pascal used the idea for further research into vacuum. Pascal's discoveries were similar to Torricelli's research as Pascal used similar methods to pull vacuum using mercury. In the year 1661, the mayor of Magdeburg used this discovery to invent or retrofit new ideas. The mayor Otto von Guericke created the first air pump, modified water pumps, and also modified manometers. Modern vacuum engineering provides the solution for thin film needs in the mechanical industry. This engineering is used for R&D needs or large-scale material production.

Vacuum was used to propel trains experimentally.

Pump technology hit a plateau until Geissler and Sprengle in the mid 19th century, who provided access to the high-vacuum regime. This led to the study of electrical discharges in vacuum, discovery of cathode rays, discovery of X-rays and the discovery of the electron. The photoelectric effect was observed in high vacuum, which was a key discovery that lead to the formulation of quantum mechanics and much of modern physics.

== See also ==
- Foreline
- Joining materials
- Negative pressure (disambiguation)
- Suction
- Ultra high vacuum
- Vacuum metallurgy
  - Vacuum arc remelting
  - Vacuum deposition
  - Vacuum induction melting
  - Vacuum plasma spraying
  - Vacuum molding
- Vacuum casting
- Vacuum chamber
- Vacuum distillation
- Vacuum evaporation
- Vacuum flange
- Vacuum furnace
- Vacuum gauge
- Vacuum grease
- Vacuum oven
- Vacuum packing
- Vacuum pump
- Vacuum tube
