= Vacuum melting =

Vacuum melting may refer to:

- Vacuum induction melting
- Vacuum arc remelting
- Any melting in a Vacuum furnace

== See also ==
- Vacuum metallurgy
