= Steel industry in Taiwan =

Overview of the steel industry of Taiwan

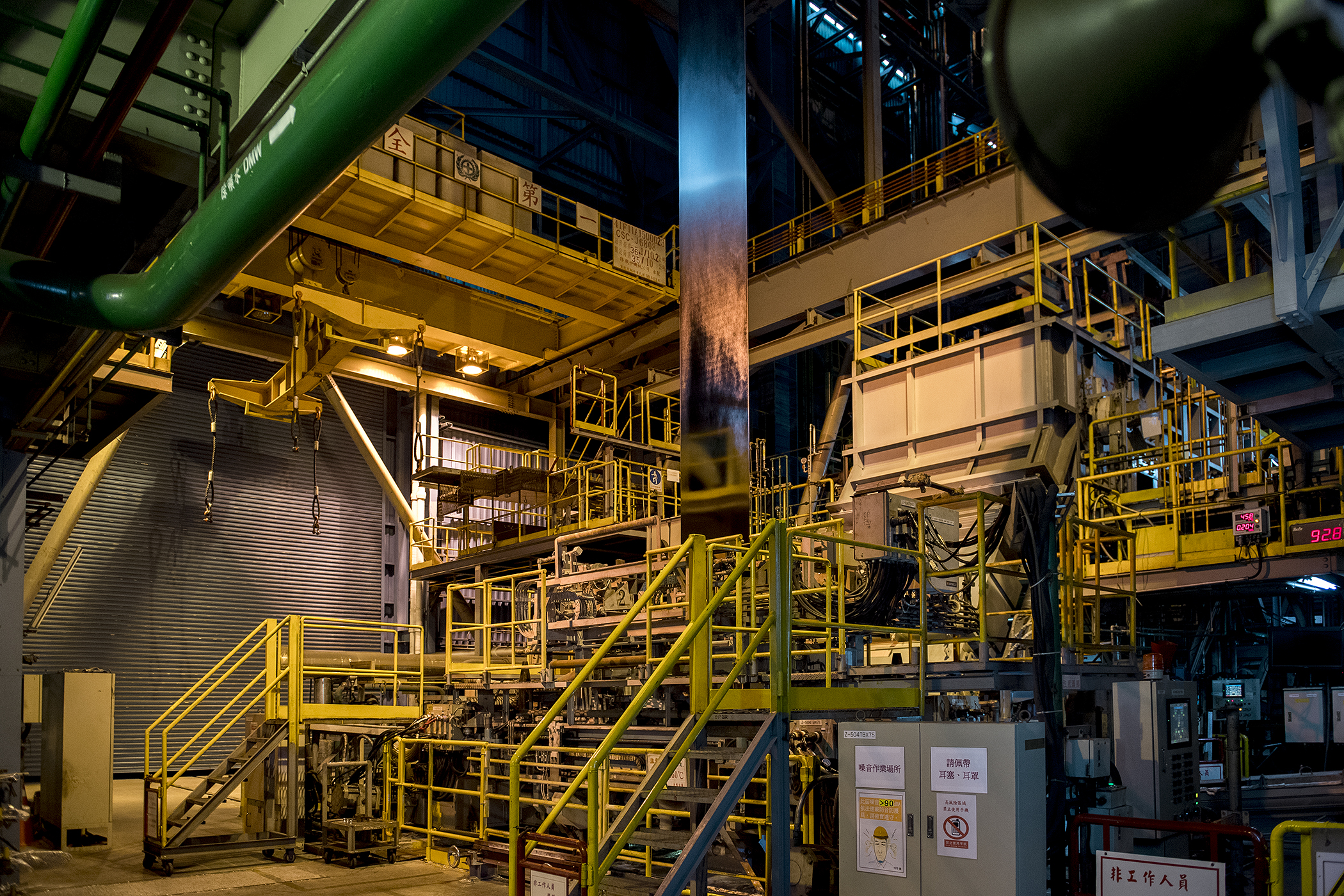
Equipment of China Steel No.3 Cold Rolling Mill

The steel industry in Taiwan is a crucial pillar of the nation's heavy industry sector, serving both domestic infrastructure development and global export markets. As of 2024, Taiwan ranked among the top thirteen steel exporters worldwide, with steady growth in export volume, production capacity, and technological innovation. The industry encompasses multiple large-scale integrated mills, electric-arc furnace (EAF) producers, and specialized alloy manufacturers.

== History ==
The modern Taiwanese steel industry began taking shape during Japanese rule, with Taiwan’s oldest steel company, Tang Eng Iron Works, founded in 1940 in Kaohsiung. Following the government's postwar industrialization drive, the state-backed China Steel Corporation (CSC) was established in 1971, launching the island’s first integrated blast furnace in 1977 and completing expansions through the 1980s. The industry later diversified in the 1990s with private players like An Feng Steel (founded 1986), Taiwan Steel Group, and specialty alloy-maker Gloria Material Technology Corp. entering the market.

Electric-arc furnace producers, including Tung Ho Steel and Yieh Loong, gained prominence from the late 1990s onwards. These focused on producing rebar and construction-grade steel while promoting resource-efficient and lower-emission practices.

== Production, capacity and employment ==
The industry contributes significantly to Taiwan’s GDP through exports, infrastructure projects, and value-added processing, alongside downstream sectors like machine tools and construction. China Steel Corporation remains Taiwan's largest steel producer, with an annual crude-steel capacity of approximately 10 million tonnes in 2024. EAF producers like Tung Ho, TSG affiliates, An Feng and Yieh Loong add several million tonnes more, pushing Taiwan's total annual crude-steel output well beyond 19 million tonnes in 2024, ranking the country as the thirteenth highest in the world. The domestic industry employs tens of thousands of workers directly, with thousands more in related machining and processing sectors. It is estimated that more than 90,000 workers are employed in the steel production industry in Taiwan.

== Trade and exports ==
Taiwan, as of 2017, is the world's thirteenth-largest steel exporter. In 2018, Taiwan exported 12.2 million metric tons of steel, a one percent increase from 12.0 million metric tons in 2017. Taiwan's exports represented about 3 percent of all steel exported globally in 2017, based on available data. The volume of Taiwan's 2018 steel exports was one-sixth that of the world's largest exporter, China, and nearly one-third that of the second-largest exporter, Japan. In value terms, steel represented just 3.6 percent of the total amount of goods Taiwan exported in 2018. Taiwan exports steel to more than 130 countries and territories. Over the decade from 2009 to 2019, Taiwan grew its steel exports by 24%. In 2018, the US imported 300,000 metric tons of pipe and tube products. Taiwan has developed a vast export trade to its most proximate neighbours in flat products. Taiwan's stainless steel exports numbered 2018 about 500,000 metric tons. In value terms, steel comprised around 3.6% of Taiwan's total exports in 2018.

== Innovation, sustainability and recycling ==
Taiwanese steel firms have led in urban mining—recycling industrial and electronic waste into high-quality steel and specialty metals. China Steel Corporation's partners like Tung Ho, along with Solar Applied Materials Technology, reclaim materials such as zinc, copper, gallium, and indium from scrap and industrial by-products, cutting raw material dependency, carbon emissions, and hazardous waste. Tung Ho's leadership in forming the Taiwan Steel Union with competitors for joint scrap processing has made it one of the leading urban mining operations globally, recycling tens of thousands of tonnes annually and reducing carbon dioxide emissions.

== Challenges ==
Despite achievements, Taiwan’s steel sector faces challenges including global overcapacity, international competition from lower-cost producers, volatile raw material prices, and shifts in trade policies. Compliance pressures on environmental impact, especially from blast furnace operations, have prompted consolidation and modernization to improve emissions performance and process efficiency.

== List of companies in Taiwan ==
- An Feng Steel
- China Steel
- Chun Yuan Steel
- Gloria Material Technology Corp.
- Tang Eng Iron Works

== See also ==
- History of the steel industry (1850–1970)
- History of the steel industry (1970–present)
- List of countries by steel production
- List of steel producers
- Steel mill
