= Conflat (disambiguation) =

Conflat(s) may refer to:

== Rail transport ==
- Conflat (railways), type of flatbed rail wagon (freight car) designed to carry a demountable container

== Vacuum Flanges ==
- Conflat (vacuum flanges), used to make an ultrahigh vacuum seal between two pipes

== Places ==
- Conflat, an ancient name for the Glasgow suburb of Easterhouse#Easterhouse village and the origin of name Easterhouse
