= Marklund convection =

Convection process in currents of plasma

Marklund convection, named after Swedish physicist Göran Marklund, is a convection process that takes place in filamentary currents of plasma. It occurs within a plasma with an associated electric field, that causes convection of ions and electrons inward towards a central twisting filamentary axis. A temperature gradient within the plasma will also cause chemical separation based on different ionization potentials.

== Mechanism ==
In Marklund's paper, the plasma convects radially inwards towards the center of a cylindrical flux tube. During this convection, the different chemical constituents of the plasma, each having its specific ionization potential, enters into a progressively cooler region. The plasma constituents will recombine and become neutral, and thus no longer under the influence of the electromagnetic forcing. The ionization potentials will thus determine where the different chemicals will be deposited.

This provides an efficient means to accumulate matter within a plasma. In a partially ionized plasma, electromagnetic forces act on the non-ionized material indirectly through the viscosity between the ionized and non-ionized material.

Hannes Alfvén showed that elements with the lowest ionization potential are brought closest to the axis, and form concentric hollow cylinders whose radii increase with ionization potential. The drift of ionized matter from the surroundings into the rope means that the rope acts as an ion pump, which evacuates surrounding regions, producing areas of extremely low density.

== See also ==
- QCD string, sometimes called a flux tube
- Flux transfer event
- Birkeland current
- Magnetohydrodynamics (MHD)
