= Gloria Material Technology Corp. =

Gloria Material Technology Corp. 榮剛材料科技
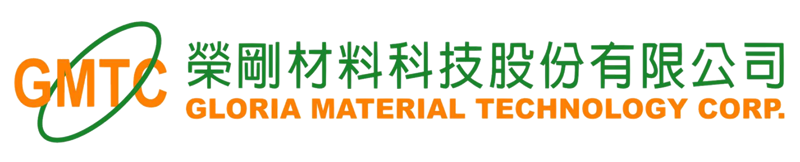
- Type: Public (OTC) (TPEx: 5009)
- Industry: Steelmaking
- Founded: March, 1993
- Headquarters: Liouying, Tainan, Taiwan
- Area served: Worldwide
- Key people: Dr. Robert Chen (Chairman & CEO); Dr. Charlie Chang (President)
- Products: Superalloy; Titanium alloy ESR & VAR steel High speed steel Stainless steel Quenched-tempered steel Tool steel Special steel profile Precision parts machining
- Revenue: US$291 million (2013)
- Number of employees: 1,200 (November, 2014)
- Subsidiaries: S-Tech Corp. Homkom Precision Industry Corp. Golden Win Steel Industrial Corp. (Taiwan); Golden Win Steel Industrial Corp. (Vietnam); Goldway Special Metal Co., Ltd. (Guangzhou ) Goldway Special Metal Co., Ltd. (Tianjin); Goldway Special Metal Co., Ltd. (Jiaxing); Goldway Special Metal Co., Ltd. (Xi'an); Alloy Tool Steel, Inc.
- Website: www.gmtc.com.tw

Gloria Material Technology Corp.
- Traditional Chinese: 榮剛材料科技股份有限公司
Transcriptions

Gloria Material Technology Corp. (GMTC; Chinese: 榮剛材料科技; pinyin: Rónggāng Cáiliào Kējì) is a company headquartered in Liouying industrial zone, Tainan, Taiwan. It is the only specialty alloy professional manufacturer in Taiwan which owns melting, forging, rolling, heat treating and finishing processes. GMTC provides more than 500 steel grades such as superalloy, titanium alloy, ESR & VAR steel, high speed steel, stainless steel, quenched-tempered steel, tool steel, special steel profile and precision parts machining. The main product shapes are focused on round bars and square bars.

== Products ==
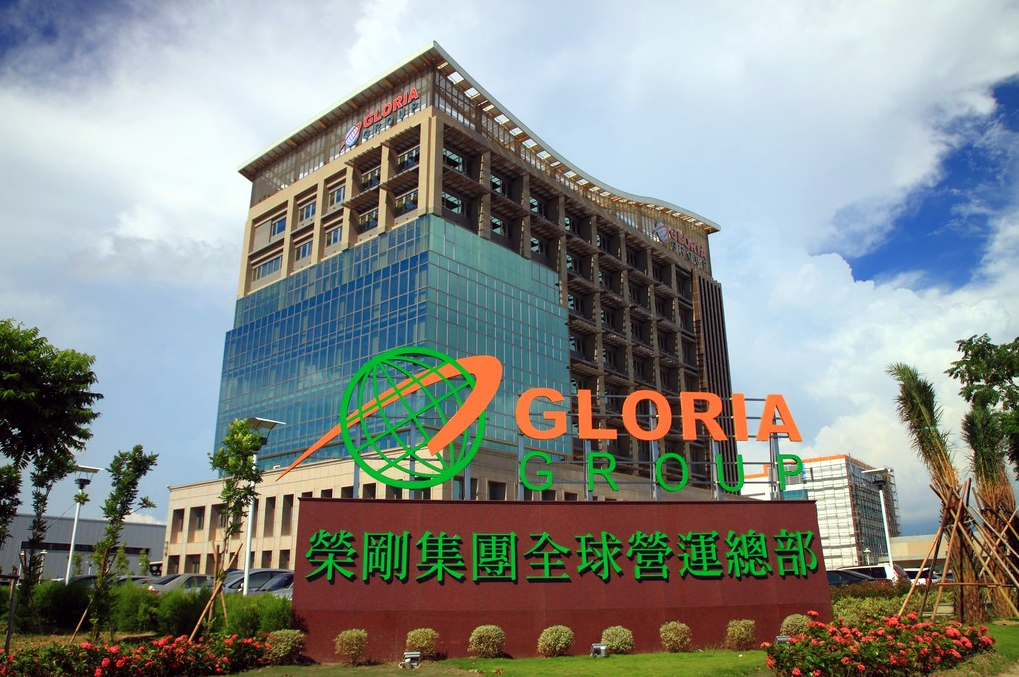
Gloria Group Headquarters is located in Liuying industrial zone, Tainan City, Taiwan.

- Superalloy
- Titanium alloy: ti-bar, ti-sheet, titanium welding coil, ti-tube, forging / machining parts
- VAR (vacuum arc remelting) & ESR (electro-slag remelting) steel
- Stainless steel: 300 series, 400 series, precipitation hardening, duplex
- Tool steel: cold work tool steel, hot work tool steel, low alloy steel, bearing steel
- High speed steel
- Quenched & tempered steel: alloy steel +QT, stainless steel +QT
- Plastic mold steel: round bar, block
- Special steel profile
- Precision parts machining

== Affiliated companies ==
Taiwan

- S-Tech Corp.: titanium and nickel alloy, precision finish and engineering integration
- Homkom Precision Industry Corp.: special steel profile hot rolling, cold drawing, closed die forging and precision part machining
- Golden Win Steel Industrial Corp.: Gloria group logistic service in Taoyuan, Taichung and Tainan in Taiwan

China Mainland

- Goldway Special Metal Co., Ltd. (Guangzhon): Gloria group logistic service in Guangzhou
- Goldway Special Metal Co., Ltd. (Tianjin): Gloria group logistic service in Tianjin
- Goldway Special Metal Co., Ltd. (Zhejiang Jiaxing ): Gloria group logistic service in Zhejiang Jiaxing
- Goldway Special Metal Co., Ltd. (Xi'an): Gloria group logistic service in Xi'an

Southeast Asia

- Golden Win Steel Industrial Corp. (Vietnam): Gloria group logistic service in Vietnam

America

- Alloy Tool Steel, Inc.: Gloria group logistic service in the United States

== See also ==
- List of companies of Taiwan
