= Sorption pump =

Vacuum pump

The sorption pump is a vacuum pump that creates a vacuum by adsorbing molecules on a very porous material like molecular sieve which is cooled by a cryogen, typically liquid nitrogen. The ultimate pressure is about 10^{−2} mbar. With special techniques this can be lowered till 10^{−7} mbar. The main advantages are the absence of oil or other contaminants, low cost and vibration free operation because there are no moving parts. The main disadvantages are that it cannot operate continuously and cannot effectively pump hydrogen, helium and neon, all gases with lower condensation temperature than liquid nitrogen. The main application is as a roughing pump for a sputter-ion pump in ultra-high vacuum experiments, for example in surface physics.

== Construction ==
A sorption pump is usually constructed in stainless steel, aluminium or borosilicate glass. It can be a simple Pyrex flask filled with molecular sieve or an elaborate metal construction consisting of a metal flask containing perforated tubing and heat-conducting fins. A pressure relief valve can be installed. The design only influences the pumping speed and not the ultimate pressure that can be reached. The design details are a trade-off between fast cooling using heat conducting fins and high gas conductance using perforated tubing.

The typical molecular sieve used is a synthetic zeolite with a pore diameter around 0.4 nanometer ( Type 4A ) and a surface area of about 500 m^{2}/g. The sorption pump contains between 300 g and 1.2 kg of molecular sieve. A 15-liter system will be pumped down to about 10^{−2} mbar by 300 g molecular sieve.

== Operation ==
The sorption pump is a cyclic pump and its cycle has 3 phases: sorption, desorption and regeneration.

In the sorption phase the pump is used to create a vacuum. This is achieved by cooling the pump body to low temperatures, typically by immersing it in a Dewar flask filled with liquid nitrogen. Gases will now either condense or be adsorbed by the large surface of the molecular sieve.

In the desorption phase the pump is allowed warm up to room temperature and the gases escape through the pressure relief valve or other opening to the atmosphere. If the pump has been used to pump toxic, flammable or other dangerous gasses one has to be careful to vent safely into the atmosphere as all gases pumped during the sorption phase will be released during the desorption phase.

In the regeneration phase the pump body is heated to 300 °C to drive off water vapor that does not desorb at room temperature and accumulates in the molecular sieve. It takes typically 2 hours to fully regenerate a pump.

The pump can be used in a cycle of sorption and desorption until it loses too much efficiency and is regenerated or in a cycle where sorption and desorption are always followed by regeneration.

After filling a sorption pump with new molecular sieve it should always be regenerated as the new molecular sieve is probably saturated with water vapor. Also when a pump is not in use it should be closed off from the atmosphere to prevent water vapor saturation.

== Performance improvement ==
Pumping capacity can be improved by prepumping the system by another simple and clean vacuum pump like a diaphragm pump or even a water aspirator or compressed-air venturi pump.

Sequential or multistage pumping can be used to attain lower pressures. In this case two or more pumps are connected in parallel to the vacuum vessel. Every pump has a valve to isolate it from the vacuum vessel. At the start of the pump down all valves are open. The first pump is cooled down while the others are still hot. When the first pump has reached its ultimate pressure it is closed off and the next pump is cooled down. Final pressures are in the 10^{−4} mbar region. What is left is mainly helium because it is almost not pumped at all. The final pressure almost equals the partial pressure of helium in air.

A sorption pump does pump all gases effectively with the exception of hydrogen, helium and neon which do not condensate at liquid nitrogen temperatures and are not efficiently adsorbed by the molecular sieves because of their small molecular size. This problem can be solved by purging the vacuum system with dry pure nitrogen before pump down. In purged system with aspirator rough pumping ultimate pressures of 10^{−4} mbar for a single sorption pump and 10^{−7} mbar for sequential pumping can be reached. A typical source of dry pure nitrogen would be a liquid nitrogen Dewar head space.

It has been suggested that by applying a dynamic pumping technique hydrogen, helium and neon can also be pumped without resorting to dry nitrogen purging. This is done by precooling the pump with the valve to the vacuum vessel closed. The valve is opened when the pump is cold and the inrush of adsorbable gases will carry all other gases into the pump. The valve is closed before hydrogen, helium or neon can back-migrate into the vacuum vessel. Sequential pumping can also be applied. No final pressures are given.

Continuous pumping may be simulated by using two pumps in parallel and letting one pump pump the system while the other pump, temporally sealed-off from the system, is in the desorption phase and venting to the atmosphere. When the pump is well desorbed it is cooled down and reconnected to the system. The other pump is sealed-off and goes into desorption. This becomes a continuous cycle.
