= Vacuum flange =

Flange used in connecting vacuum equipment

A vacuum flange is a flange at the end of a tube used to connect vacuum chambers, tubing and vacuum pumps to each other. Vacuum flanges are used for scientific and industrial applications to allow various pieces of equipment to interact via physical connections and for vacuum maintenance, monitoring, and manipulation from outside a vacuum's chamber. Several flange standards exist with differences in ultimate attainable pressure, size, and ease of attachment.

== Vacuum flange types ==
Several vacuum flange standards exist, and the same flange types are called by different names by different manufacturers and standards organizations.

=== KF/QF ===
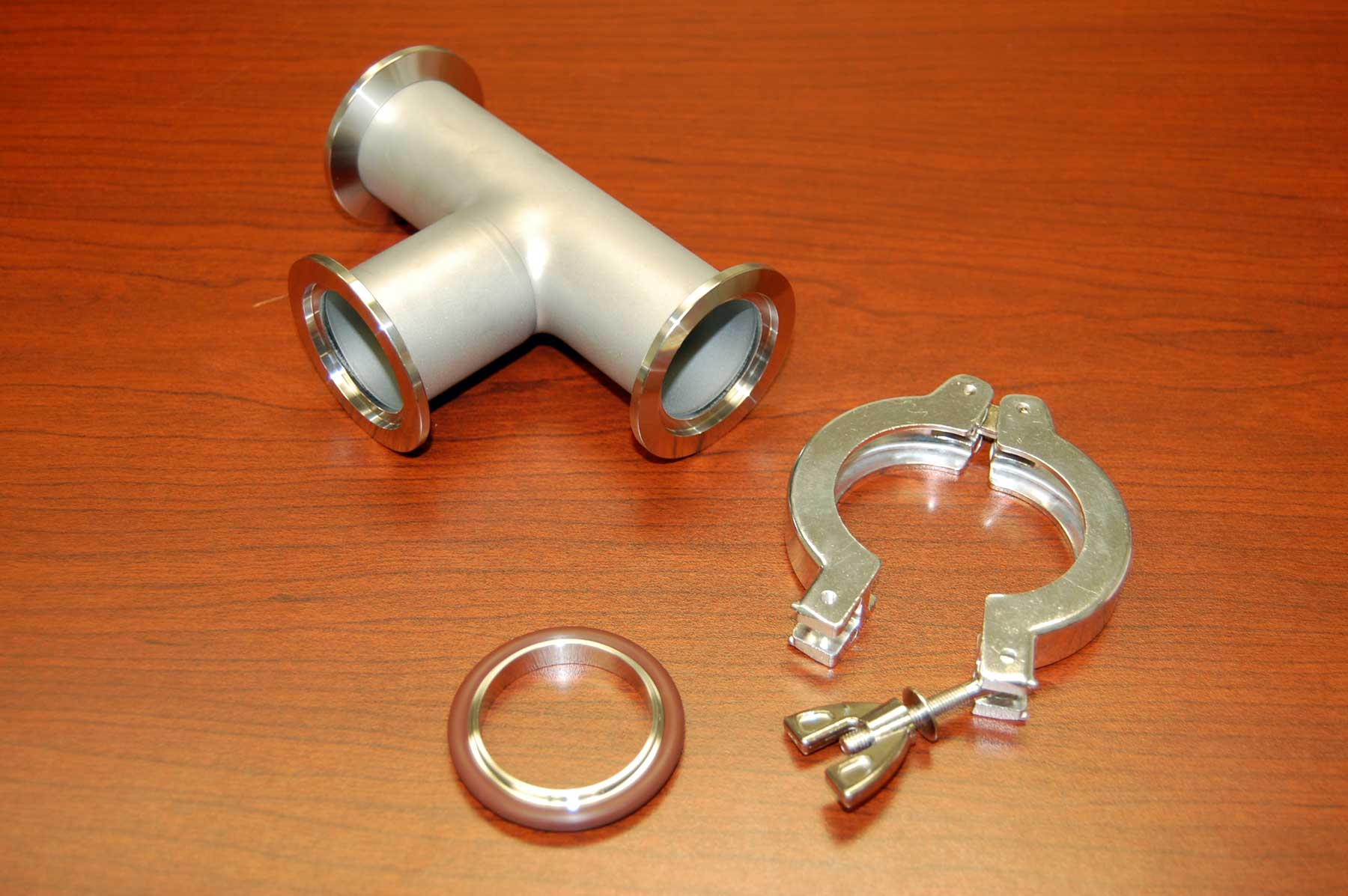
A KF-25 tee, o-ring, and clamp

The ISO standard quick-release flange is known by the names Quick Flange (QF) or Kleinflansch (KF, German which translates to "Small flange" in English). The KF designation has been adopted by ISO, DIN, and Pneurop. KF flanges are made with a chamfered back surface that is attached with a circular clamp and an elastomeric o-ring (AS568 specification) that is mounted in a metal centering ring. Standard sizes are indicated by the nominal inner diameter in millimeters for flanges 10 through 50 mm in diameter. Sizes 10, 20 and 32 are less common sizes (see Renard numbers). Some sizes share their flange dimensions with their respective larger neighbor and use the same clamp size. This means a DN10KF can mate to a DN16KF by using an adaptive centering ring. The same applies for DN20KF to DN25KF and DN32KF to DN40KF.

Flange	O-ring size
DN10KF	AS-311
DN16KF	AS-314
DN20KF	
DN25KF	AS-320
DN32KF	
DN40KF	AS-326
DN50KF	AS-330

=== ISO ===
The ISO large flange standard is known as LF, LFB, MF or sometimes just ISO flange. As in KF flanges, the flanges are joined by a centering ring and an elastomeric o-ring. An extra spring-loaded circular clamp is often used around the large-diameter o-rings to prevent them from rolling off from the centering ring during mounting.

ISO large flanges come in two varieties. ISO-K (or ISO LF) flanges are joined with double-claw clamps, which clamp to a circular groove on the tubing side of the flange. ISO-F (or ISO LFB) flanges have holes for attaching the two flanges with bolts. Two tubes with ISO-K and ISO-F flanges can be joined by clamping the ISO-K side with single-claw clamps, which are then bolted to the holes on the ISO-F side.

ISO large flanges are available in sizes from 63 to 500 mm nominal tube diameter:

Flange	Tube diameter (mm)
DN63LF	63.5
DN100LF	102
DN160LF	160
DN200LF	200
DN250LF	254
DN320LF	316
DN400LF	400
DN500LF	500

=== CF (Conflat) ===
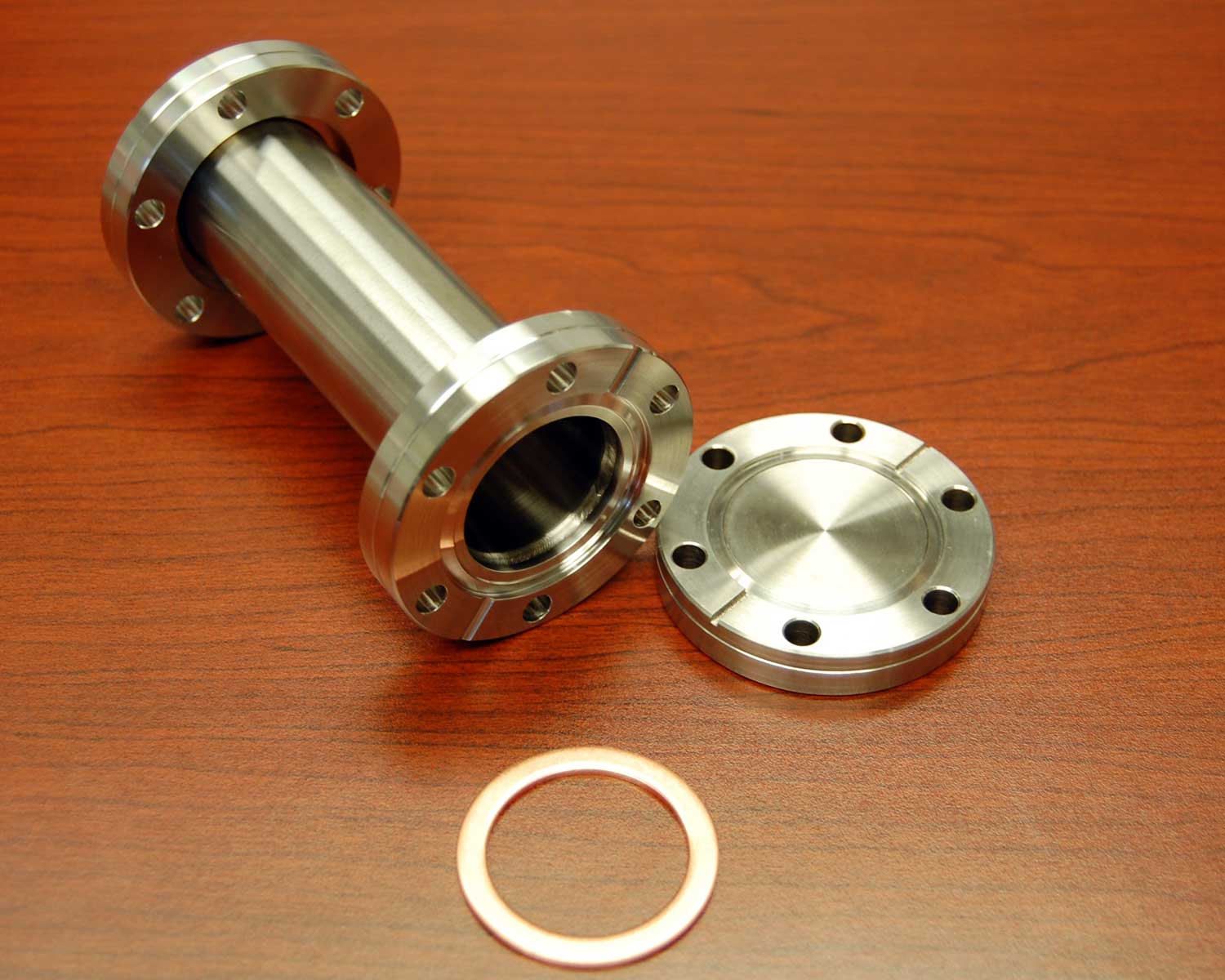
A 2 3/4-inch (70 mm) CF (conflat) full nipple with blank flange and oxygen-free high thermal conductivity copper gasket

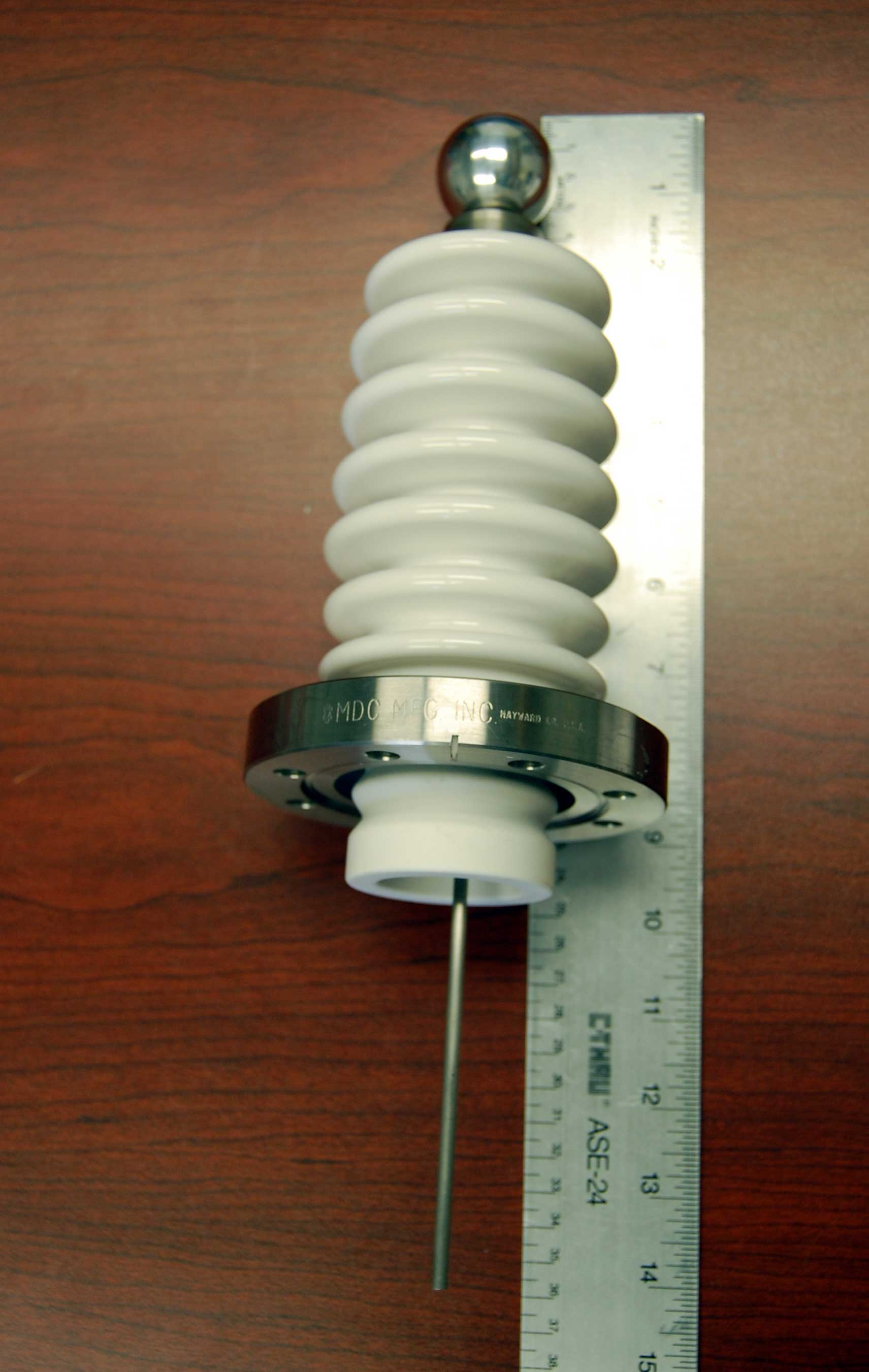
A 60 kV high-voltage electrical feedthrough on a 4 1/2-inch (110 mm) (or DN63) conflat flange

CF (ConFlat) flanges use a gasket (typically oxygen-free high thermal conductivity copper or aluminum) and a knife-edge flange (stainless steel for copper gaskets and hardened aluminum for aluminum gaskets) to achieve an ultrahigh vacuum seal. The term "ConFlat" is a registered trademark of Varian, Inc., so "CF" is commonly used by other flange manufacturers. Each face of the two mating CF flanges has a knife edge, which cuts into the softer metal gasket, providing an extremely leak-tight, metal-to-metal seal. Deformation of the metal gasket fills small defects in the flange, allowing ConFlat flanges to operate down to 10^{−13} Torr (10^{−11} Pa) pressure. The knife edge is recessed in a groove in each flange. In addition to protecting the knife edge, the groove helps hold the gasket in place, which aligns the two flanges and also reduces gasket expansion during bake-out. For stainless-steel ConFlat flanges, baking temperatures of 450 °C can be achieved; the temperature is limited by the choice of gasket material. CF flanges are sexless and interchangeable. In North America, flange sizes are given by flange outer diameter in inches, while in Europe and Asia, sizes are given by tube inner diameter in millimeters. Despite the different naming conventions, the actual flanges are the same.

European, Asian size	North American size [inches]
DN10	1
DN16	1 1/3 ("mini")
DN25	2 1/8
DN40 (or DN35)	2 3/4
DN50	3 3/8
DN63	4 1/2
DN75	4 5/8
DN100	6
DN125	6 3/4
DN160 (or DN150)	8
DN200	10
DN250	12
	13 1/4
	14
	16 1/2

ConFlat gaskets were originally invented by William Wheeler and other engineers at Varian in an attempt to build a flange that would not leak after baking.

=== Wheeler ===
A Wheeler flange is a large wire-seal flange often used on large vacuum chambers.

=== American Standards Association (ASA) ===
A flange standard popularized in the United States is codified by the American National Standards Institute (ANSI), and is also sometimes named after the organization's previous name, the American Standards Association (ASA). These flanges have elastomeric o-ring seals and can be used for both vacuum and pressure applications. Flange sizes are indicated by tube nominal inner diameter (ANSI naming convention) or by flange outer diameter in inches (ASA naming convention).

Nominal inner diameter/ANSI	Flange outer diameter [inches]/ASA
1	4.25
1.5	5
2	6
3	7.5
4	9
6	11
8	13.5
10	16

== Vacuum gaskets ==
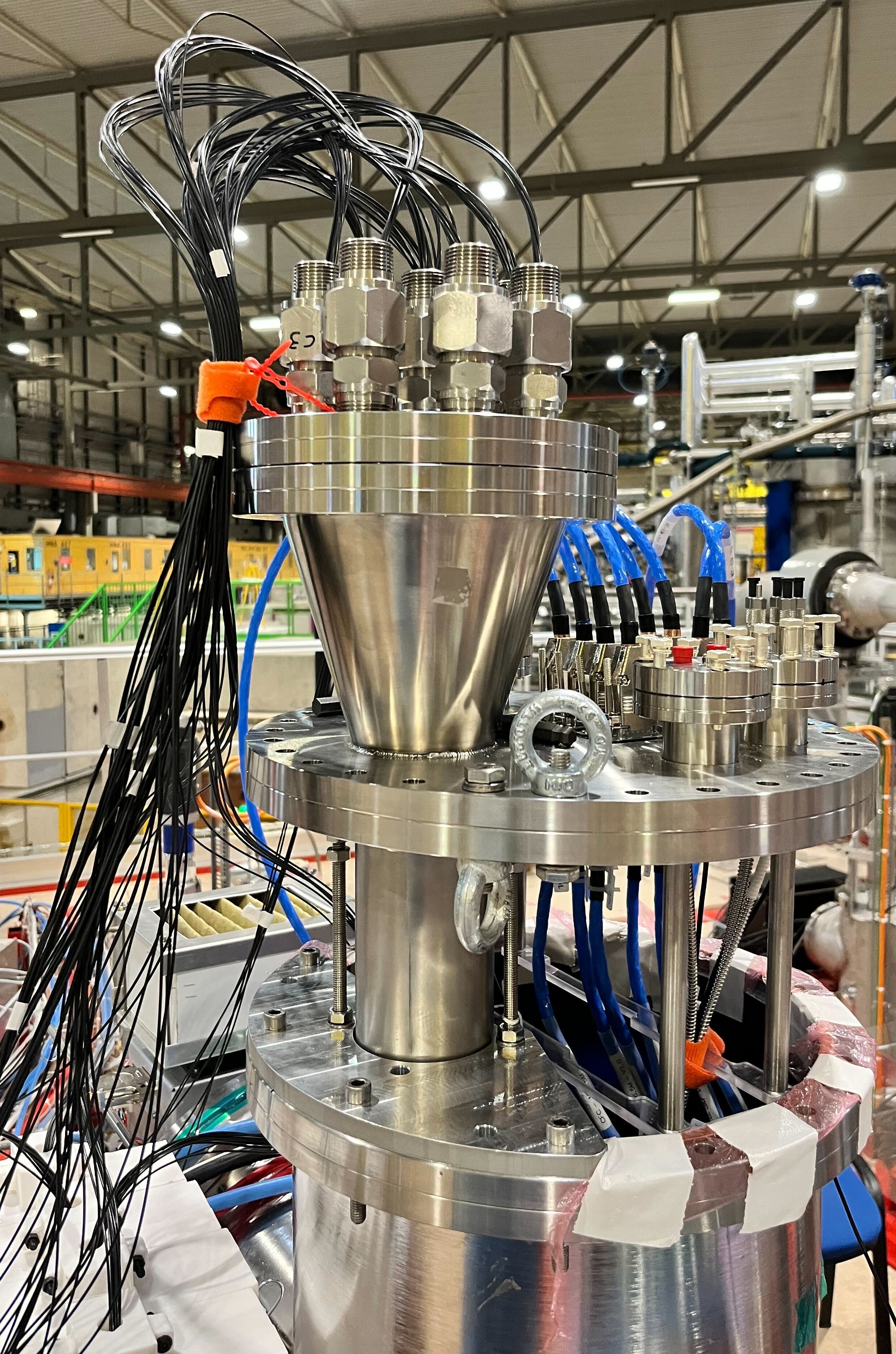
Example of fiber optic vacuum feedthrough in ProtoDUNE-VD at CERN

To achieve a vacuum seal, a gasket is required. An elastomeric o-ring gasket can be made of Buna rubber, viton fluoropolymer, silicone rubber or teflon. O-rings can be placed in a groove or may be used in combination with a centering ring or as a "captured" o-ring that is held in place by separate metal rings. Metal gaskets are used in ultra-high-vacuum systems where outgassing of the elastomer could be a significant gas load. A copper ring gasket is used with ConFlat flanges. Metal wire gaskets made of copper, gold or indium can be used.

== Vacuum feedthrough ==
A vacuum feedthrough is a flange that contains a vacuum-tight electrical, physical or mechanical connection to the vacuum chamber. An electrical feedthrough allows voltages to be applied to components under vacuum, for example a filament or heater. An example of a physical feedthrough is a vacuum-tight connection for cooling water. A mechanical feedthrough is used for rotation and translation of components under vacuum. A wobble stick is a mechanical feedthrough device that can be used to pick up, move and otherwise manipulate objects in a vacuum chamber.

== See also ==
- Vacuum engineering
- Vacuum grease
