= James Johnston Dobbie =

British chemist (1852–1924)

Portrait by Walter Stoneman, 1918

Sir James Johnston Dobbie, FRS FRSE FIC FCS (4 August 1852 – 19 June 1924) was a British chemist. He was known for the isolation, chemical structure, and physical properties (especially UV and visible spectra) of alkaloids. He isolated hydroxycodeine from opium and synthesized diphenylene. He carried out UV-VIS spectra of gaseous main group elements and organic compounds.

== Early life ==
He was born at 189 Duke Street in Glasgow on 4 August 1852 the son of Alexander Dobbie a local chemist. He was educated at Glasgow High School and then Glasgow University graduating MA in 1875. He continued as a postgraduate at University of Edinburgh under William Ramsay, receiving a DSc in 1879.

== Career ==
Dobbie was appointed first head of chemistry at Bangor University, then the University College of North Wales, in 1884 and built the department up in its early years.

He was elected a Fellow of the Royal Society of Edinburgh in 1903. His proposers were Sir Francis Grant Ogilvie, Alexander Crum Brown, Ramsay Heatley Traquair and Andrew Gray.

He was elected a Fellow of the Royal Society in 1904. He was director of the Royal Scottish Museum from 1903 to 1909, and principal of the Government Laboratory, London from 1909 to 1920. He was appointed President in the Royal Institute of Chemistry from 1915–1917 and was elected president of the Chemical Society in 1919. He was knighted in 1915.

His family was long associated with Fairlie, North Ayrshire, in 1920 in retired to the village, and on 19 June 1924 he died there. He is buried in Largs Cemetery.

== Personal life ==
He married Violet Chilton in 1887. They had a son Alexander Middleton Dobbie who died when he was 19 years old and is commemorated at Prenes British Cemetery in France. Dobbie died on 19 June 1924.
