= Emily Aston =

British chemist (1866–1948)

- Born: 4 January 1866; Paddington, London
- Died: 18 March 1948 (aged 82); Five Ashes, Sussex, England
- Education: University College London
- Scientific career
- Fields: Chemistry

Emily Alicia Aston (4 January 1866 – 18 March 1948) was a British chemist primarily known for her high publication output during the late 1800s.

She was born in Paddington to Joseph Keech Aston and Sarah Eccles. Aston earned bachelor's degrees in both chemistry and geology from University College London before beginning her research career. She studied a broad range of topics, including mineral analysis, atomic weight determination, and organic structure studies, and was most famous for her work on molecular surface energies with Sir William Ramsay between 1893 and 1902. Aston appeared on 14 publications over a sixteen-year period (1886-1902); a "notable feat" for women chemists during that time period. She was appointed a science research scholarship by Her Majesty's Commissioners in 1895 to proceed with research that would be beneficial to the country.

== Academic career ==
Emily Aston began her early education at Queen's College, London and Bedford College between the years of 1883 and 1885. During this time, she conducted her first research in chemistry and crystallisation under Spencer Pickering, a professor at Bedford College. The research work was over the investigation of multiple sulphates. In 1885, Aston left Bedford College and enrolled in University College, London where she studied geology, mathematics and chemistry, earning her B.Sc. in geology and chemistry in 1889.

Over the next ten years, Aston continued her research at University College, London, focusing on analytical chemistry and collaborating in several research projects with the men on staff, including geologist Thomas George Bonney. In the late 1890s, Aston left University College, London to conduct research at the University of Geneva, Switzerland with Philippe Auguste Guye on optical rotation, and at the Sorbonne in Paris with Paul Dutoit on electrolytic conductivity and molecular association. After her time in France and Switzerland, Aston's name never appeared on any other publications. According to census information of 1901 and 1911, her occupation was shown as "private means." She was thought to have dropped out of research all together, and on March 18, 1948, she was pronounced dead in Uckfield, Sussex.

== Publications ==
Aston's first works were published in the Journal of the Chemical Society, Transactions in 1886 while she was attending Bedford College. Most of Aston's publications were joint publications, accompanying John Norman Collie on organic structure studies, James Walker on physical chemistry, and Sir William Ramsay on mineral analysis and atomic weight determination. Her highlighted works include a series of publications with Ramsay during the 1893-1902 time period that focused on molecular surface energy of mixtures of non-associating liquids. In the year of 1895, Aston received a science research scholarship by Her Majesty's Commissioners. During her time researching electrolytic conductivity and molecular association at Sorbonne, she co-authored two publications with Paul Dutoit. Emily Aston is known for her high publication output during the 16 year time period between 1886 and 1902. During this time, she co-authored 18 publications over a broad range of topics including mineralogy, organic chemistry, inorganic chemistry and physical chemistry.
