= Electro-slag remelting =

Remelting and refining process

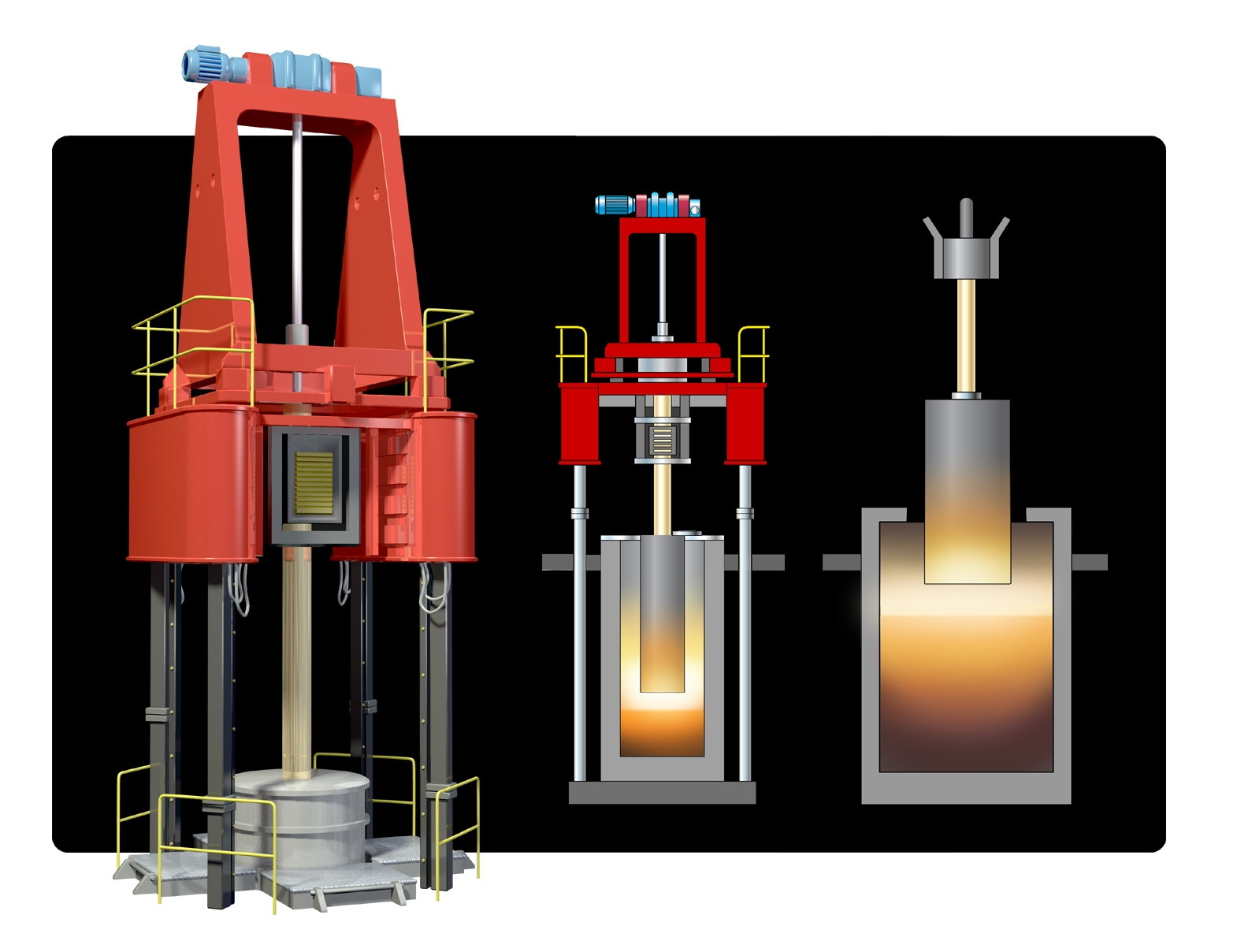
Rendering of electro-slag remelting apparatus and cross-sections

Electroslag remelting (ESR), also known as electro-flux remelting, is a process of remelting and refining steel and other alloys for mission-critical applications in aircraft, thermal power stations, nuclear power plants, military technology and others.

The electroslag remelting (ESR) process is used to remelt and refine steels and various super-alloys, resulting in high-quality ingots. This process can be started up through vacuum induction melting. The ESR process uses the as-cast alloy as a consumable electrode. Electric current (generally AC) is passed between the electrode and the new ingot, which is formed in the bottom of a water-cooled copper mold. The new ingot is covered in an engineered slag that is superheated by the electric current. The electrode tip is slowly melted from contact with the slag. These metal droplets travel through the slag to the bottom of the water-cooled mold and slowly freeze as the ingot is directionally solidified upwards from the bottom of the mold. The slag pool floats above the refined alloy, continuously floating upwards as the alloy solidifies. The molten metal is cleaned of impurities that chemically react with the slag or otherwise float to the top of the molten pool as the molten droplets pass through the slag.

Electroslag remelting uses highly reactive slags (calcium fluoride, lime, alumina, or other oxides are usually the main components) to reduce the amount of type-A sulfide present in biometal alloys. It is a common practice in European industries. ESR reduces other types of inclusions as well, and is seen as an alternative to the vacuum arc remelting (VAR) method that is prevalent in US industries.

An example of the use of the electro-slag refined (ESR) steel technique is the L30 tank gun.

CrNi60WTi is a stainless steel which is best formed by either electro-slag remelting or vacuum arc remelting. This alloy can be used for the construction of nuclear power plants.

== See also ==
- Vacuum induction melting
