= Roughing pump =

Vacuum pump

A roughing pump is any vacuum pump (typically mechanical) used to initially evacuate a vacuum system, as a first stage towards achieving high vacuum or ultra high vacuum. The term "roughing pump" derives from the vacuum range it works in, "rough vacuum", above 0.001 torr (0.1 Pa). Pumps that operate in the high vacuum ranges typically don't operate, or only operate inefficiently, at atmospheric pressures, whereas pumps that work efficiently at atmospheric pressure usually cannot produce a vacuum lower than approximately 0.001 torr.

One consideration for choosing a roughing pump is whether the pump uses lubricating oil that's exposed to the vacuum. This concern of "hydrocarbon backstreaming" where pump oil as a gas makes its way into the vacuum chamber, has led to oil-free pump designs on the market.

== Types ==
Two main types of roughing pumps are oil-sealed roughing pumps and dry roughing pumps. Within the two categories are various kinds of designs with differences among them based on maintenance issues, initial costs, pump lifespan and vacuum level. Early in their manufacture, dry pumps were significantly more expensive than oil-based pumps, however over time the cost gap has closed.

The advantages and disadvantages of each are as follow:

Oil Sealed Pumps
| Type | Advantages | Disadvantages |
|---|---|---|
| Rotary Vane | Low ultimate pressure Low cost Long pump life | Backstreams oil Produce hazardous waste |
| Rootes Lobe | Very high pumping speed | Frequent maintenance Requires a purge gas Requires a backing pump Must be absolutely horizontal |
| Rotary Piston | High volume Low cost | Noise; Vibration; Safety valve |
Dry Roughing Pumps
| Scroll | Clean; Low "dry" ultimate pressure Easily servicable Quiet; Evolved from air conditioning compressor so technology is well known | Limited bearing life Limited scroll life Permeable to small gases Not hermetically sealed Clean applications only |
| Diaphragm | Low cost Quiet; Easily serviced | Low pumping speed High ultimate pressure Frequent service required |
| Hook & Claw | No backstreaming Low ultimate pressure | Expensive |
| Screw Rotor | Low ultimate pressure Less maintenance than Hook & Claw | Expensive |
| Dry Piston | Low ultimate pressure | Expensive |
| Sorption | Clean; No moving parts | Requires Liquid nitrogen Requires regeneration Limited capacity |

== Sources ==
- The Essentials of a Vacuum System, Hasina Jamal, University of Maryland
