= William Ramsay =

Scottish chemist (1852–1916)

Sir William Ramsay KCB FRS FRSE
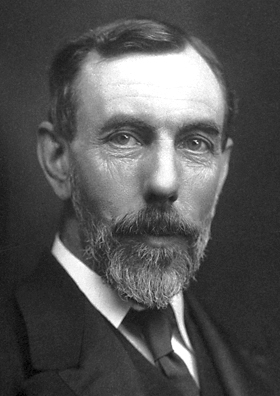
- Ramsay in 1904
- Born: 2 October 1852; Glasgow, Scotland
- Died: 23 July 1916 (aged 63); High Wycombe, England
- Education: University of Glasgow; Anderson's University; University of Tübingen (PhD)
- Known for: Discovering noble gases Ramsay grease
- Awards: Leconte Prize (1895); Barnard Medal for Meritorious Service to Science (1895); Davy Medal (1895); Longstaff Prize (1897); Nobel Prize in Chemistry (1904); Matteucci Medal (1907); Elliott Cresson Medal (1913)
- Scientific career
- Fields: Chemistry
- Workplaces: University of Glasgow (1874–80); University College, Bristol (1880–87); University College London (1887–1913)
- Doctoral advisor: Wilhelm Rudolph Fittig
- Doctoral students: Edward Charles Cyril Baly; James Johnston Dobbie; Jaroslav Heyrovský

Sir William Ramsay (/ˈræmzi/; 2 October 1852 – 23 July 1916) was a Scottish chemist who discovered the noble gases and received the Nobel Prize in Chemistry in 1904 "in recognition of his services in the discovery of the inert gaseous elements in air" along with his collaborator, John William Strutt, 3rd Baron Rayleigh, who received the Nobel Prize in Physics that same year for their discovery of argon. After the two men identified argon, Ramsay investigated other atmospheric gases. His work in isolating argon, helium, neon, krypton, and xenon led to the development of a new section of the periodic table.

== Early life ==
Ramsay was born at 2 Clifton Street in Glasgow on 2 October 1852, the son of civil engineer and surveyor, William C. Ramsay, and his wife, Catherine Robertson. The family lived at 2 Clifton Street in the city centre, a three-storey and basement Georgian townhouse. The family moved to 1 Oakvale Place in the Hillhead district in his youth. He was a nephew of the geologist Sir Andrew Ramsay.

He was educated at Glasgow Academy and then apprenticed to Robert Napier, a shipbuilder in Govan. However, he instead decided to study chemistry at the University of Glasgow, matriculating in 1866 and graduating in 1869. He then undertook practical training with the chemist Thomas Anderson and then went to study in Germany at the University of Tübingen with Wilhelm Rudolph Fittig where his doctoral thesis was entitled Investigations in the Toluic and Nitrotoluic Acids.

Ramsay went back to Glasgow as Anderson's assistant at Anderson College. He was appointed as Professor of Chemistry at the University College of Bristol in 1879 and married Margaret Buchanan in 1881. In the same year he became the Principal of University College, Bristol, and somehow managed to combine that with active research both in organic chemistry and on gases.

== Career ==
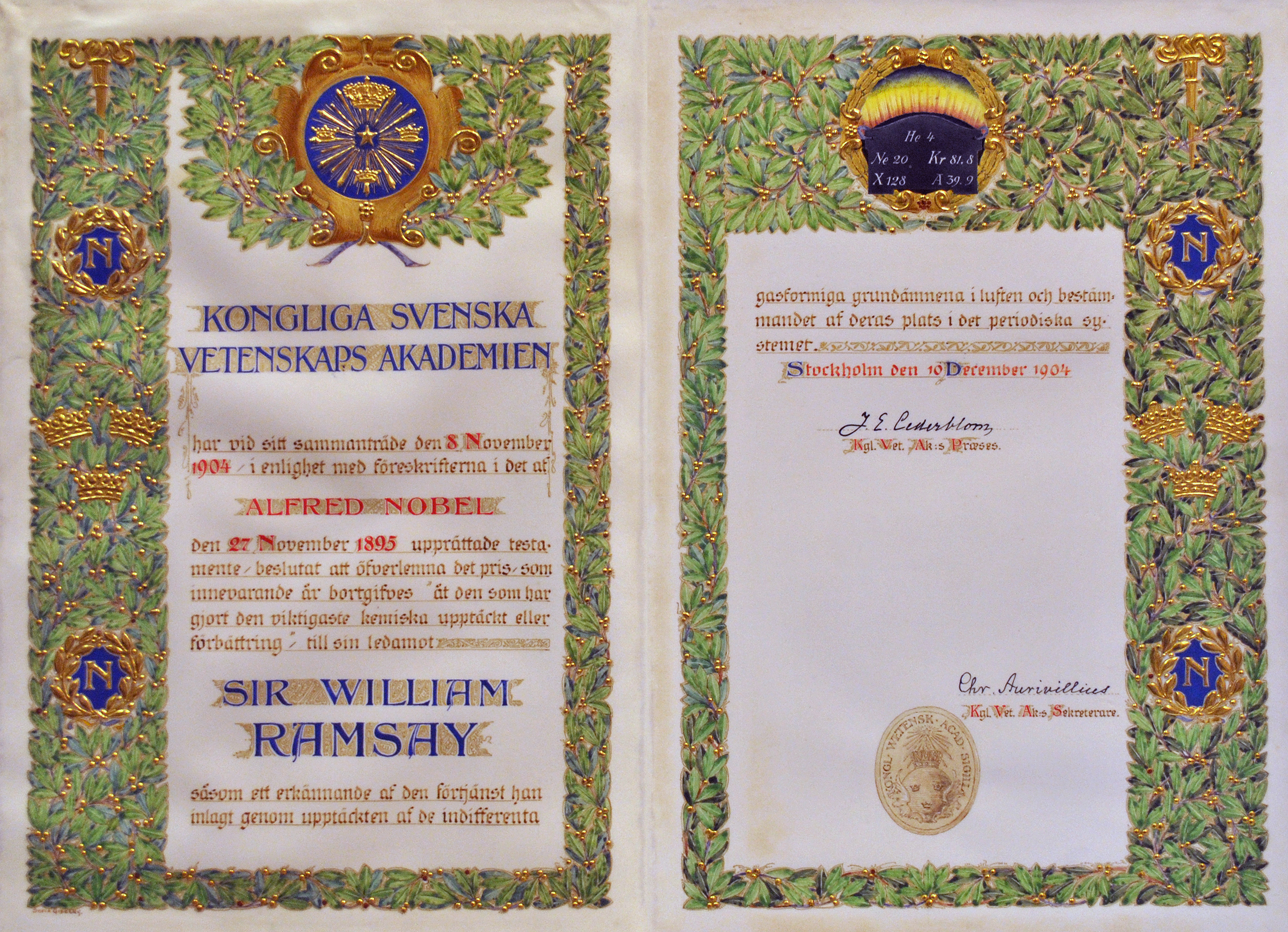
William Ramsay's Nobel Prize certificate

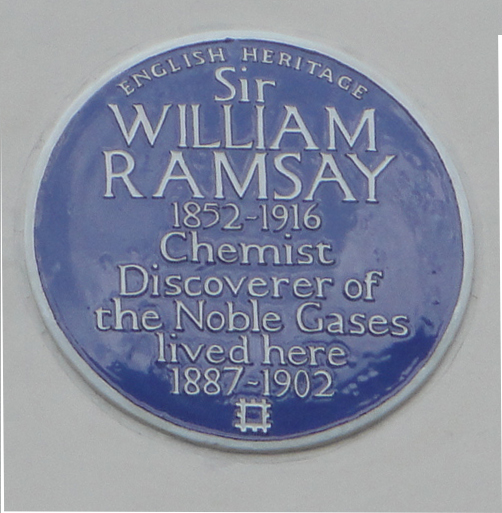
Blue plaque at 12 Arundel Gardens commemorating the work of William Ramsay

William Ramsay formed pyridine in 1876 from acetylene and hydrogen cyanide in an iron-tube furnace in what was the first synthesis of a heteroaromatic compound. In 1887, he succeeded Alexander Williamson as the chair of Chemistry at University College London (UCL). It was here at UCL that his most celebrated discoveries were made. As early as 1885–1890, he published several notable papers on the oxides of nitrogen, developing the skills that he needed for his subsequent work. On the evening of 19 April 1894, Ramsay attended a lecture given by Lord Rayleigh. Rayleigh had noticed a discrepancy between the density of nitrogen made by chemical synthesis and nitrogen isolated from the air by removal of the other known components. After a short conversation, he and Ramsay decided to investigate this. In August Ramsay told Rayleigh he had isolated a new, heavy component of air, which did not appear to have any chemical reactivity. He named this inert gas "argon", from the Greek word meaning "lazy". In the following years, working with Morris Travers, he discovered neon, krypton, and xenon. He also isolated helium, which had only been observed in the spectrum of the sun, and had not previously been found on earth. In 1910 he isolated and characterised radon.

During 1893–1902, Ramsay collaborated with Emily Aston, a British chemist, in experiments on mineral analysis and atomic weight determination. Their work included publications on the molecular surface energies of mixtures of non-associating liquids.

Ramsay was elected an International Member of the American Philosophical Society in 1899.Elected to Honorary membership of the Manchester Literary and Philosophical Society at the Annual General Meeting, 25 April 1899

He was appointed a Knight Commander of the Order of the Bath (KCB) in the 1902 Coronation Honours list published on 26 June 1902, and invested as such by King Edward VII at Buckingham Palace on 24 October 1902.

In 1904, Ramsay received the Nobel Prize in Chemistry. That same year, he was elected an International Member of the United States National Academy of Sciences. Ramsay's standing among scientists led him to become an adviser to the Indian Institute of Science. He suggested Bangalore as the location for the institute.

Ramsay endorsed the Industrial and Engineering Trust Ltd., a company that claimed it could extract gold from seawater, in 1905. It bought property on the English coast to begin its secret process. The company never produced any gold.

Ramsay was the president of the British Association in 1911–1912.

== Personal life ==
In 1881, Ramsay was married to Margaret Johnstone Marshall (née Buchanan), daughter of George Stevenson Buchanan. They had a daughter, Catherine Elizabeth (Elska) and a son, William George, who died at 40.

Ramsay lived in Hazlemere, Buckinghamshire, until his death. He died in High Wycombe, Buckinghamshire, on 23 July 1916 from nasal cancer at the age of 63 and was buried in Hazlemere parish church.

== Collections ==
University College London Special Collections holds letters from Ramsay to Lt. F W Smith of the 7th Bedfordshire Regiment about the manufacture of bombs, written in 1915.

== Legacy ==
A blue plaque at number 12 Arundel Gardens, Notting Hill, commemorates his life and work.

The Sir William Ramsay School in Hazlemere and Ramsay grease are named after him.

There is a memorial to him by Charles Hartwell in the north aisle of the choir at Westminster Abbey.

In 1923, University College London named its new Chemical Engineering department and seat after Ramsay, which had been funded by the Ramsay Memorial Fund. One of Ramsay's former graduates, H. E. Watson was the third Ramsay professor of chemical engineering.

On 2 October 2019, Google celebrated his 167th birthday with a Google Doodle.

== See also ==
- Clan Ramsay
