= Ion pump =

Type of vacuum pump

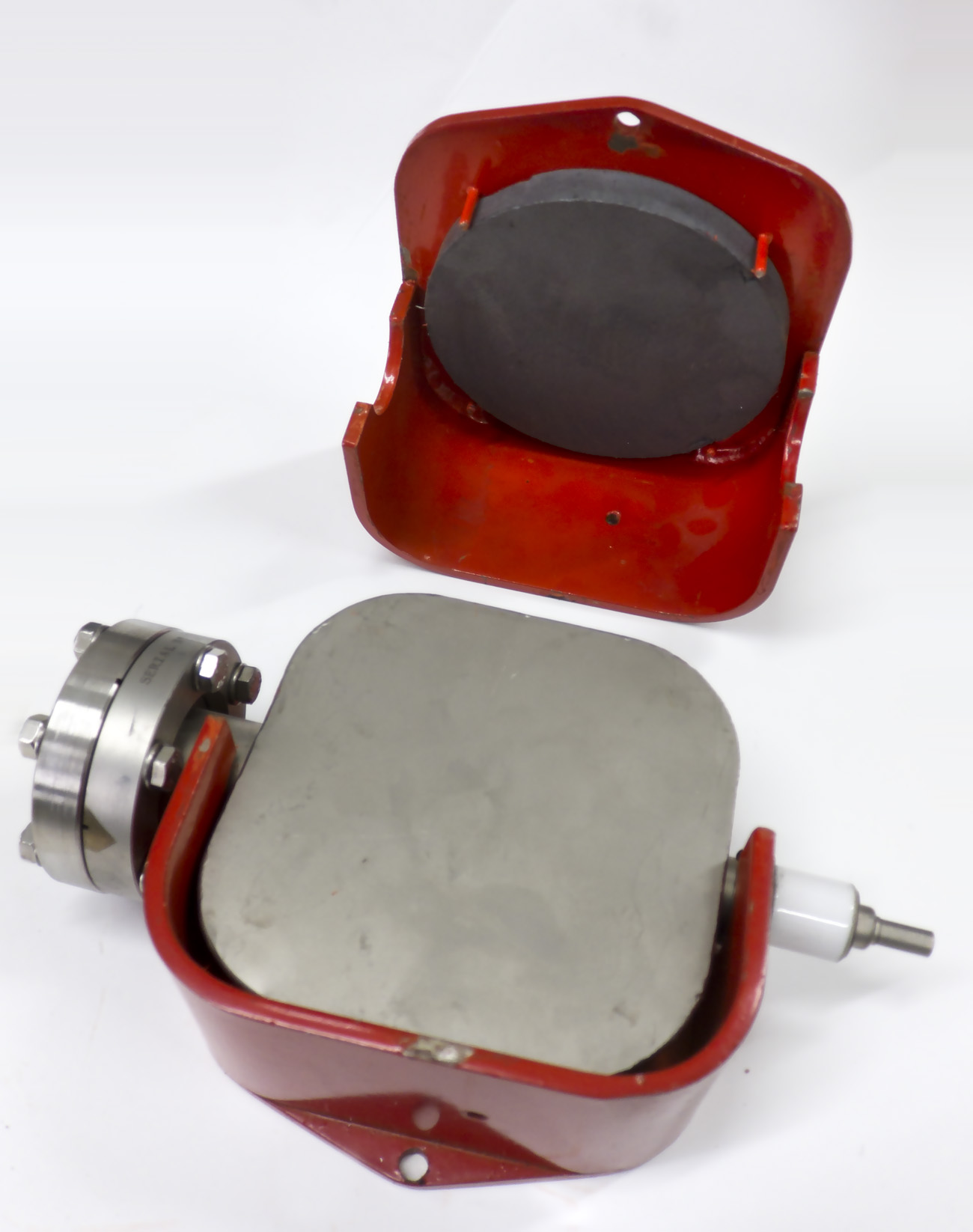
A small ion pump, with the top cover and top magnet taken off.

An ion pump (also referred to as a sputter ion pump) is a type of vacuum pump which operates by sputtering a metal getter. Under ideal conditions, ion pumps are capable of reaching pressures as low as 10^{−11} mbar. An ion pump first ionizes gas within the vessel it is attached to and employs a strong electrical potential, typically 3–7 kV, which accelerates the ions into a solid electrode. Small bits of the electrode are sputtered into the chamber. Gasses are trapped by a combination of chemical reactions with the surface of the highly-reactive sputtered material, and being physically trapped underneath that material.

== History ==
The first evidence for pumping from electrical discharge was found 1858 by Julius Plücker, who did early experiments on electrical discharge in vacuum tubes. In 1937, Frans Michel Penning observed some evidence of pumping in the operation of his cold cathode gauge. These early effects were comparatively slow to pump, and were therefore not commercialized. A major advance came in the 1950s, when Varian Associates were researching improvements for the performance of vacuum tubes, particularly on improving the vacuum inside the klystron. In 1957, Lewis D Hall, John C Helmer, and Robert L Jepsen filed a patent for a significantly improved pump, one of the earliest pumps that could get a vacuum chamber to ultra-high vacuum pressures.

== Working principle ==
The basic element of the common ion pump is a Penning trap. A swirling cloud of electrons produced by an electric discharge is temporarily stored in the anode region of a Penning trap. These electrons ionize incoming gas atoms and molecules. The resultant swirling ions are accelerated to strike a chemically active cathode (usually titanium). On impact the accelerated ions will either become buried within the cathode or sputter cathode material onto the walls of the pump. The freshly sputtered chemically active cathode material acts as a getter that then evacuates the gas by both chemisorption and physisorption resulting in a net pumping action. Inert and lighter gases, such as He and H_{2} tend not to sputter and are absorbed by physisorption. Some fraction of the energetic gas ions (including gas that is not chemically active with the cathode material) can strike the cathode and acquire an electron from the surface, neutralizing it as it rebounds. These rebounding energetic neutrals are buried in exposed pump surfaces.

Both the pumping rate and capacity of such capture methods are dependent on the specific gas species being collected and the cathode material absorbing it. Some species, such as carbon monoxide, will chemically bind to the surface of a cathode material. Others, such as hydrogen, will diffuse into the metallic structure. In the former example, the pump rate can drop as the cathode material becomes coated. In the latter, the rate remains fixed by the rate at which the hydrogen diffuses.

== Types ==
There are three main types of ion pumps: the conventional or standard diode pump, the noble diode pump and the triode pump.

=== Standard diode pump ===
A standard diode pump is a type of ion pump employed in high vacuum processes which contains only chemically active cathodes, in contrast to noble diode pumps. Two sub-types may be distinguished: the sputter ion pumps and the orbitron ion pumps.

==== Sputter ion pump ====
In diode sputter ion pumps, one or more hollow anodes (on positive high voltage) are placed between two cathode plates, with an intense magnetic field parallel to the axis of the anodes in order to augment the path of the electrons in the anode cells.

==== Orbitron ion pump ====
In the orbitron vacuum pumps, electrons are caused to travel in spiral orbits between a central anode, normally in the form of a cylindrical wire or rod, and an outer or boundary cathode, generally in the form of a cylindrical wall or cage. The orbiting of the electrons is achieved without the use of a magnetic field, even though a weak axial magnetic field may be employed.

=== Noble diode pump ===
A noble diode pump is a type of ion pump used in high-vacuum applications that employs both a chemically reactive cathode, such as titanium, and an additional cathode composed of tantalum. The tantalum cathode serves as a high-inertia crystal lattice structure for the reflection and burial of neutrals, increasing pumping effectiveness of inert gas ions. Pumping intermittently high quantities of hydrogen with noble diodes should be done with great care, as hydrogen might over months get re-emitted out of the tantalum.

Schematic view of a triode ion pump

=== Triode pump ===
The triode pump has a grounded anode and the cathode on negative high voltage (−3 to −7 kV). The cathode is a titanium grid. Residual gas molecules that get ionized are attracted by the cathode and sputter it, which leads to deposition of Ti on the walls of the pump (the walls between vacuum and atmosphere). There, the Ti acts as a getter. Furthermore, ions can also be reflected at the Ti cathode and neutralized during the reflection. Then, they collide with the (Ti-covered) walls and can be implanted there. This mechanism is responsible for pumping noble gases, which are not bound by chemical reactions with the getter.

== Applications ==
Ion pumps are commonly used in ultra-high vacuum (UHV) systems, as they can attain ultimate pressures below 10^{−11} mbar. In contrast to other common UHV pumps, such as turbomolecular pumps and diffusion pumps, ion pumps have no moving parts and use no oil. They are therefore clean, need little maintenance, and produce no vibrations. These advantages make ion pumps well-suited for use in scanning probe microscopy, molecular beam epitaxy and other high-precision apparatuses.

Ion pumps cannot start at atmospheric pressure but only at low pressures. Typically, a turbomolecular pump or sorption pump is used for pumping from atmosphere to about 10^{−6} mbar (or lower); then the ion pump can be started.

== Radicals ==
Recent work has suggested that free radicals escaping from ion pumps can influence the results of some experiments.

== See also ==
- Electroosmotic flow
- Marklund convection

== Sources ==
- "Agilent Ion Pumps, Early History" (PDF).
- Hablanian, Marsbed. "Gettering and Ion Pumping". High-Vacuum Technology: A Practical Guide. ISBN 082478197X. Archived from the original on May 9, 2006.
- "Sputter Ion Pumps" (PDF). Paul Scherrer Institute.
