= Ramsay grease =

Lubricant

Ramsay grease is a vacuum grease, used as a lubrication and a sealant of ground glass joints and cocks on laboratory glassware, e.g. burettes. It is usable to about 10^{−2} mbar (about 1 Pa) and about 30 °C. Its vapor pressure at 20 °C is about 10^{−4} mbar (0.01 Pa). It is named after Sir William Ramsay.

Different grades exist (e.g. thick or viscous, soft). The viscous one is used for standard stopcocks and ground joints. The soft grade is for large stopcocks and ground joints, desiccators, and for lower temperature use. Ramsay grease consists of paraffin wax, petroleum jelly, and crude natural rubber, in ratio 1:3:7 to 1:8:16. Due to the rubber content it has less tendency to flow.

One recipe for a grease usable up to 25 °C consists of 6 parts of petroleum jelly, 1 part of paraffin wax, and 6 parts of Pará rubber.

The dropping point of Leybold-brand Ramsay grease is 56 °C; its maximum service temperature is 25-30 °C. Its vapor pressure at 25 °C is 10^{−7} torr (0.013 mPa), at 38 °C it is 10^{−4} torr (13 mPa).

An equivalent of Ramsay grease can be made by cooking lanolin with natural rubber extracted from golf balls.
