= Vacuum grease =

Vacuum grease is a lubricant with low volatility and is used for applications in low pressure environments. Lubricants with higher volatility would evaporate, causing two problems:

- They would not be present to provide lubrication.
- They would make lowering the pressure below their vapor pressure difficult.

As well as a lubricant, vacuum grease is also used as a sealant for joints in vacuum systems. This is usually limited to soft vacuums, as ultra high vacuum or high temperatures may give problems with the grease outgassing. Grease is most commonly used with glass vacuum systems. All metal systems usually use knife-edge seals in soft metals instead. Where O ring seals are used, these should not be greased (in static seals at least) as it can cause the O rings to become permanently distorted when compressed.

In electronics manufacturing processes, vacuum grease is often used to prevent corrosion.

One of the early vacuum greases is the Ramsay grease.

== Examples ==
- Perfluoropolyether
