= Flux transfer event =

Event causing a magnetic portal to open between the Earth and the Sun

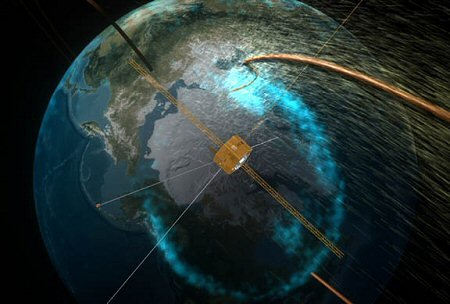
An artist's impression of a flux transfer event.

A flux transfer event (FTE) occurs when a magnetic portal opens in the Earth's magnetosphere through which high-energy particles flow from the Sun. This connection, while previously thought to be permanent, has been found to be brief and very dynamic. The European Space Agency's four Cluster spacecraft and NASA's five THEMIS probes have flown through and surrounded these FTEs, measuring their dimensions and identifying the particles that are transferred between the magnetic fields.

== Formation ==
According to NASA, Earth's magnetosphere and the Sun's magnetic field are constantly pressed against one another on the dayside of Earth. Approximately every eight minutes, these fields briefly merge, forming a temporary "portal" between the Earth and the Sun through which high-energy particles such as solar wind can flow. The portal takes the shape of a magnetic cylinder about the width of Earth. Current observations place the portal at up to 4 times the size of Earth.

== Simulations ==
According to NASA, since Cluster and THEMIS have directly sampled FTEs, scientists can simulate FTEs on computers to predict how they might behave. Jimmy Raeder of the University of New Hampshire told his colleagues simulations show that the cylindrical portals tend to form above Earth's equator and then roll over Earth's winter pole. In December, FTEs roll over the North Pole; in July they roll over the South Pole.

== Flux transfer events beyond Earth ==
Magnetic fields similar to Earth's are common throughout known space and many undergo similar flux transfer events. During its second flyby of the planet on October 6, 2008, the NASA probe MESSENGER discovered that Mercury’s magnetic field shows a magnetic reconnection rate ten times higher than Earth's. Mercury's proximity to the Sun only accounts for about a third of the reconnection rate observed by MESSENGER and the cause of this discrepancy is not currently known.

Most recently, it has been found that the same phenomenon, also known as a 'magnetic rope', can be observed at Saturn. The findings prove that at times Saturn "behaves and interacts with the Sun in much the same way as Earth".

== See also ==
- Flux tube
- Magnetic flux

== Sources ==
- Phillips, Dr. Tony. "NASA - Magnetic Portals Connect Sun and Earth". Archived from the original on 31 July 2009.
