= An Feng Steel =

Taiwanese steel maker

- Native name: 安鋒鋼鐵
- Industry: Steelmaking
- Founded: 1986
- Founder: Chu An-hsiung
- Headquarters: Kaohsiung, Taiwan

An Feng Steel (Chinese: 安鋒鋼鐵; pinyin: Ānfēng Gāngtiě) is a steel maker of Taiwan. Its manufacturing factory is located in Kaohsiung. The company was established in 1986 by Chu An-hsiung, and managed under the An Feng Steel Group (安鋒集團). It was the second largest steel company in Taiwan, but broke out a financial crisis in 1998. According to the records announced by banks of Taiwan, An Feng Steel is already left behind much more than 1.17 billion New Taiwan Dollars in bad debt.

== See also ==
- List of companies of Taiwan
