= Vacuum metallurgy =

Study of Materials

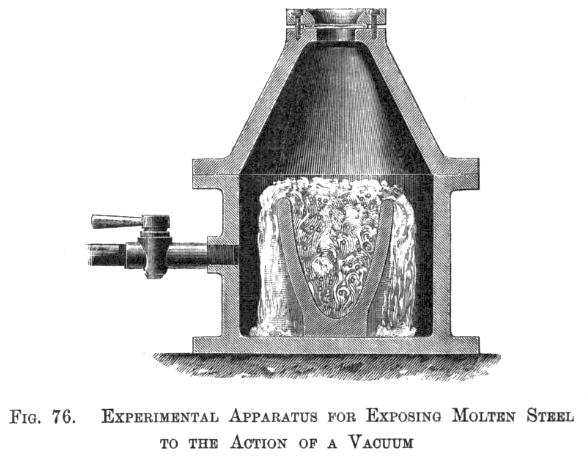
Early experimental process for treating steel in a vacuum

Vacuum metallurgy is the field of materials technology that deals with making, shaping, or treating metals in a controlled atmosphere, at pressures significantly less than normal atmospheric pressure. The purpose of vacuum metallurgy is to prevent contamination of metal by gases in the atmosphere. Alternatively, in some processes, a reactive gas may be introduced into the process to become part of the resultant product. Examples of vacuum metallurgy include vacuum degassing of molten steel in steelmaking operations, vacuum deposition of thin metal layers in manufacture of optics and semiconductors, vacuum casting, vacuum arc remelting of alloys, and vacuum induction melting.

== See also ==
- Electron-beam welding
