= Negative pressure =

Negative pressure may refer to:

- Negative value of a pressure variable
- Negative room pressure, a ventilation technique used to avoid contaminating outside areas
- Negative pressure ventilator, also known as an iron lung
- Negative-pressure wound therapy
