= Vacuum oven =

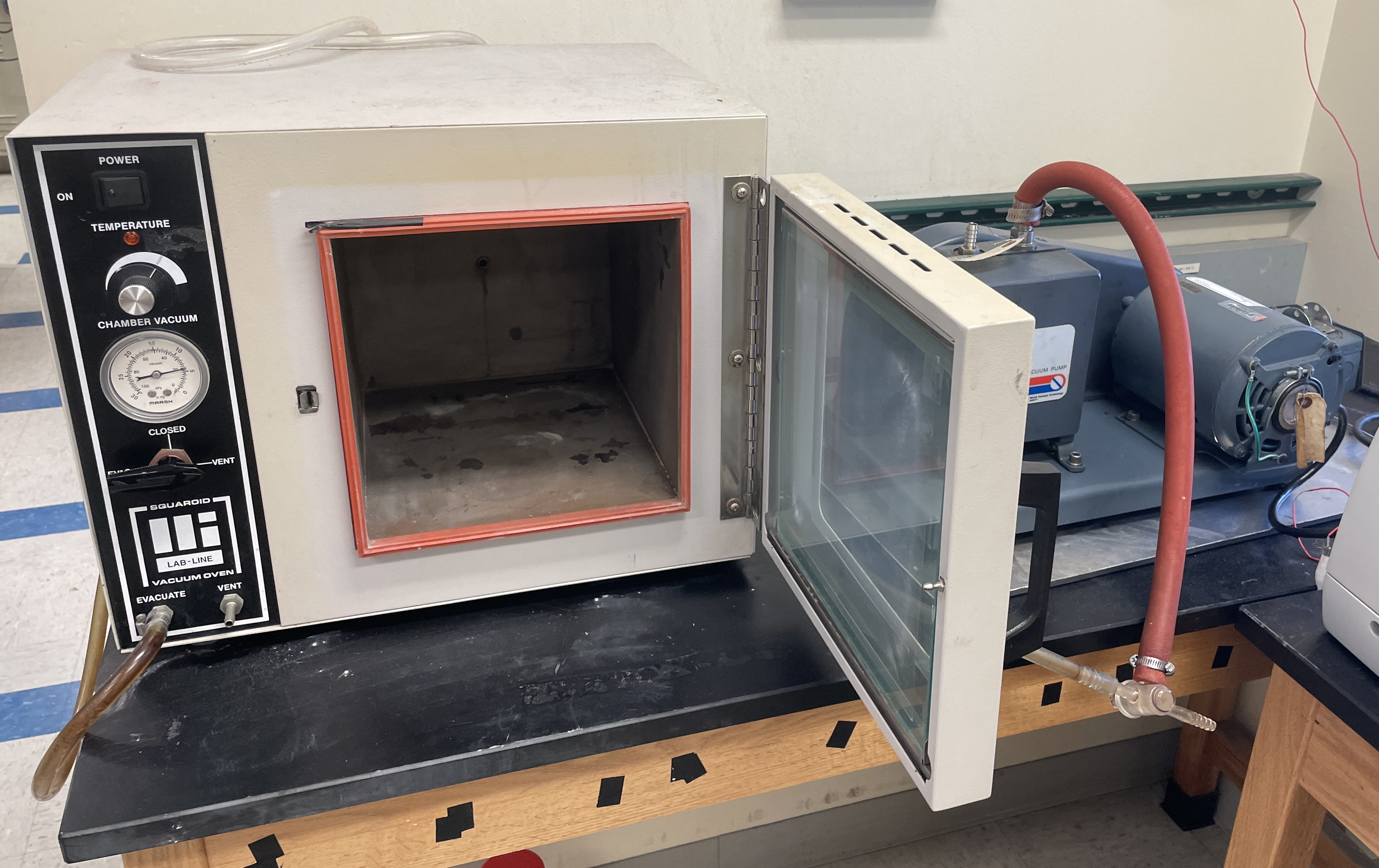
vacuum oven with oil pump

In chemistry, a vacuum oven is an oven that can also apply a vacuum to its contents. Such devices are useful for removing solvent or dehydrating samples. They are equivalent to Abderhalden's drying pistol in some ways, but vacuum ovens typically can accommodate large samples. A characteristic operation for a vacuum oven is the activation or regeneration of molecular sieves. Vacuum furnaces are related devices that operate at much higher temperatures and much lower pressures.

The acetylacetonate complex Mn(acac)_{2} is obtained by vacuum drying the yellow dihydrate Mn(acac)_{2}(H_{2}O)_{2}.
