= Vacuum furnace =

Type of furnace

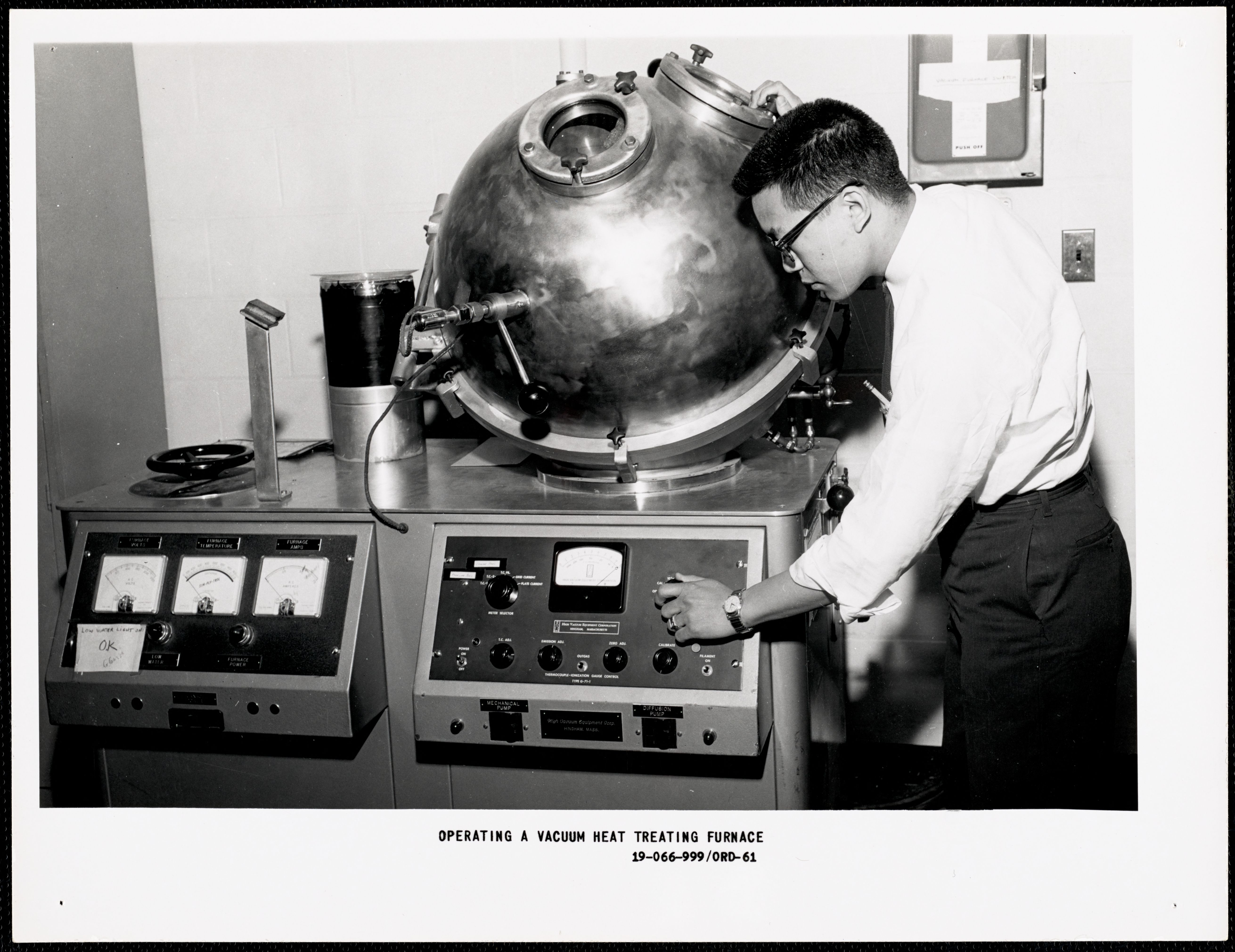
Operating a vacuum heat treating furnace, c. 1959–1962

A vacuum furnace is a type of furnace in which the product in the furnace is surrounded by a vacuum during processing. The absence of air or other gases prevents oxidation, heat loss from the product through convection, and removes a source of contamination. This enables the furnace to heat materials (typically metals and ceramics) to temperatures as high as 3,000 °C (5,432 °F) with select materials. Maximum furnace temperatures and vacuum levels depend on melting points and vapor pressures of heated materials. Vacuum furnaces are used to carry out processes such as annealing, brazing, sintering and heat treatment with high consistency and low contamination.

Characteristics of a vacuum furnace are:

- Uniform temperatures in the range. 800–3,000 °C (1,500–5,400 °F)
- Commercially available vacuum pumping systems can reach vacuum levels as low as 1×10^{−11} torrs (1.3×10^{−11} mbar; 1.3×10^{−14} atm)
- Temperature can be controlled within a heated zone, typically surrounded by heat shielding or insulation.
- Low contamination of the product by carbon, oxygen and other gases.
- Vacuum pumping systems remove low temperature by-products from the process materials during heating, resulting in a higher purity end product.
- Quick cooling (quenching) of product can be used to shorten process cycle times.
- The process can be computer controlled to ensure repeatability.

Heating metals to high temperatures in open to atmosphere normally causes rapid oxidation, which is undesirable. A vacuum furnace removes the oxygen and prevents this from happening.

An inert gas, such as Argon, is often used to quickly cool the treated metals back to non-metallurgical levels (below 400 °F [200 °C]) after the desired process in the furnace. This inert gas can be pressurized to two times atmosphere or more, then circulated through the hot zone area to pick up heat before passing through a heat exchanger to remove heat. This process continues until the desired temperature is reached.

== Common uses ==
Vacuum furnaces are used in a wide range of applications in both production industries and research laboratories. For example, a low-temperature vacuum oven can be used for drying biomass much more efficiently than drying alone. Similarly, microwave-vacuum drying has shown potential for drying foods like cranberries.

At temperatures below 1200 °C, a vacuum furnace is commonly used for the heat treatment of steel alloys. Many general heat treating applications involve the hardening and tempering of a steel part to make it strong and tough through service. Hardening involves heating the steel to a predetermined temperature, then cooling it rapidly in water, oil or suitable medium.

A further application for vacuum furnaces is Vacuum Carburizing also known as Low Pressure Carburizing or LPC. In this process, a gas (such as acetylene) is introduced as a partial pressure into the hot zone at temperatures typically between 1,600 and 1,950 °F (870 and 1,070 °C). The gas disassociates into its constituent elements (in this case carbon and hydrogen). The carbon is then diffused into the surface area of the part. This function is typically repeated, varying the duration of gas input and diffusion time. Once the workload is properly "cased", the metal is quenched using oil or high pressure gas (HPGQ). For HPGQ, nitrogen or, for faster quench helium, is commonly used. This process is also known as case hardening.

Another low temperature application of vacuum furnaces is debinding, a process for the removal of binders. Heat is applied under a vacuum in a sealed chamber, melting or vaporizing the binder from the aggregate. The binder is evacuated by the pumping system and collected or purged downstream. The material with a higher melting point is left behind in a purified state and can be further processed.

Vacuum furnaces capable of temperatures above 1200 °C are used in various industry sectors such as electronics, medical, crystal growth, energy and artificial gems. The processing of high temperature materials, both of metals and nonmetals, in a vacuum environment allows annealing, brazing, purification, sintering and other processes to take place in a controlled manner.
