= Ultra-high vacuum =

Artificial vacuum with very low pressure

Ultra-high vacuum (often spelled ultrahigh in American English, UHV) is the vacuum regime characterised by pressure lower than about 1×10^{−9} torrs (1×10^{−9} mbar; 1×10^{−7} Pa). UHV conditions are created by pumping the gas out of a UHV chamber, and in some cases by cooling the chamber to cryogenic temperatures. In general, there are two regimes of gas flow, laminar and free molecular, defined by whether the dominant interactions are particle-particle (laminar) or particle-chamber (molecular). At UHV pressures the mean free path of a gas molecule is greater than approximately 40 km, so the gas is in free molecular flow, and gas molecules will collide with the chamber walls many times before colliding with each other, on average. Almost all molecular interactions therefore take place on various surfaces in the chamber.

UHV conditions are integral to scientific research. Surface science experiments often require a chemically clean sample surface with the absence of any unwanted adsorbates. Surface analysis tools such as X-ray photoelectron spectroscopy and low energy ion scattering require UHV conditions for the transmission of electron or ion beams. For the same reason, beam pipes in particle accelerators such as the Large Hadron Collider are kept at UHV.

== Overview ==
Maintaining UHV conditions requires the use of unusual materials for equipment. Useful concepts for UHV include:

- Sorption of gases
- Kinetic theory of gases
- Gas transport and pumping
- Vacuum pumps and systems
- Vapour pressure

Typically, UHV requires:

- High pumping speed — possibly multiple vacuum pumps in series and/or parallel
- Minimized surface area in the chamber
- High conductance tubing to pumps — short and fat, without obstruction
- Use of low-outgassing materials such as titanium and certain stainless steels
- Avoid creating pits of trapped gas behind bolts, welding voids, etc.
- Electropolishing of all metal parts after machining or welding
- Use of low vapor pressure materials (ceramics, glass, metals, teflon if unbaked)
- Baking of the system to remove water or hydrocarbons adsorbed to surfaces, and at higher temperature/longer bakes, diffuse hydrocarbons, hydrogen, etc trapped in the bulk volume
- Some chambers have walls chilled to cryogenic temperatures during use
- Avoiding all traces of hydrocarbons, including skin oils in a fingerprint — gloves must always be used

Hydrogen and carbon monoxide are the most common background gases in a well-designed, well-baked UHV system. Both Hydrogen and CO diffuse out from the grain boundaries in stainless steel. Helium could diffuse through the steel and glass from the outside air, but this effect is usually negligible due to the low abundance of He in the atmosphere.

== Measurement ==
=== Pressure ===
Measurement of high vacuum is done using a nonabsolute gauge that measures a pressure-related property of the vacuum. See, for example, Pacey. These gauges must be calibrated. The gauges capable of measuring the lowest pressures are magnetic gauges based upon the pressure dependence of the current in a spontaneous gas discharge in intersecting electric and magnetic fields.

UHV pressures are measured with an ion gauge, either of the hot filament or inverted magnetron type.

=== Leak rate ===
In any vacuum system, some gas will continue to escape into the chamber over time and slowly increase the pressure if it is not pumped out. This leak rate is usually measured in mbar L/s or torr L/s. While some gas release is inevitable, if the leak rate is too high, it can slow down or even prevent the system from reaching low pressure.

There are a variety of possible reasons for an increase in pressure. These include simple air leaks, virtual leaks, and desorption (either from surfaces or volume). A variety of methods for leak detection exist. Large leaks can be found by pressurizing the chamber, and looking for bubbles in soapy water, while tiny leaks can require more sensitive methods, up to using a tracer gas and specialized Helium mass spectrometer.

== Outgassing ==
Outgassing is a problem for UHV systems. Outgassing can occur from two sources: surfaces and bulk materials. Outgassing from bulk materials is minimized by selection of materials with low vapor pressures (such as glass, titanium, certain [304 and 316] stainless steel, and ceramics) for everything inside the system. Although it is cost-prohibitive, titanium is the ideal material for metal chambers, because it has outgassing rates several orders of magnitude lower than any non-heat-treated stainless steel. Materials which are not generally considered absorbent can outgas, including most plastics and some metals. For example, vessels lined with a highly gas-permeable material such as palladium (which is a high-capacity hydrogen sponge) create special outgassing problems.

Outgassing from surfaces is a subtler problem. At extremely low pressures, more gas molecules are adsorbed on the walls than are floating in the chamber, so the total surface area inside a chamber is more important than its volume for reaching UHV. Water is a significant source of outgassing because a thin layer of water vapor rapidly adsorbs to everything whenever the chamber is opened to air. Water evaporates from surfaces too slowly to be fully removed at room temperature, but just fast enough to present a continuous level of background contamination. Removal of water and similar gases generally requires baking the UHV system at 200 to 400 °C (392 to 752 °F) while vacuum pumps are running. During chamber use, the walls of the chamber may be chilled using liquid nitrogen to reduce outgassing further.

=== Bake-out ===
In order to reach low pressures, it is often useful to heat the entire system above 100 °C (212 °F) for many hours (a process known as bake-out) to remove water and other trace gases which adsorb on the surfaces of the chamber. This may also be required upon "cycling" the equipment to atmosphere. This process significantly speeds up the process of outgassing, allowing low pressures to be reached much faster. After baking, to prevent humidity from getting back into the system after it is exposed to atmospheric pressure, a nitrogen gas flow that creates a small positive pressure can be maintained to keep the system dry. Stainless steel parts can be heat treated at 900 °C for more than 24 hours to achieve much lower outgassing rates.

== System design ==
=== Pumping ===
There is no single vacuum pump that can operate all the way from atmospheric pressure to ultra-high vacuum. Instead, a series of different pumps is used, according to the appropriate pressure range for each pump. In the first stage, a roughing pump clears most of the gas from the chamber. This is followed by a turbomolecular pump, and then by one or more vacuum pumps that operate at UHV pressures. Pumps commonly used in this third stage to achieve UHV include:

- Turbomolecular compound pumps which incorporate a molecular drag section and/or magnetic bearing
- Ion pumps
- Titanium sublimation pumps
- Non-evaporable getter (NEG) pumps
- Cryopumps
- Diffusion pumps, especially when used with a cryogenic trap designed to minimize backstreaming of pump oil into the systems.

Turbo pumps and diffusion pumps rely on supersonic attack upon system molecules by the blades and high speed vapor stream, respectively.

=== Airlocks ===
To save time, energy, and integrity of the UHV volume an airlock or load-lock vacuum system is often used. The airlock volume has one door or valve, such as a gate valve or UHV angle valve, facing the UHV side of the volume, and another door against atmospheric pressure through which samples or workpieces are initially introduced. After sample introduction and assuring that the door against atmosphere is closed, the airlock volume is typically pumped down to a medium-high vacuum. In some cases the workpiece itself is baked out or otherwise pre-cleaned under this medium-high vacuum. The gateway to the UHV chamber is then opened, the workpiece transferred to the UHV by robotic means or by other contrivance if necessary, and the UHV valve re-closed. While the initial workpiece is being processed under UHV, a subsequent sample can be introduced into the airlock volume, pre-cleaned, and so-on and so-forth, saving much time. Although a "puff" of gas is generally released into the UHV system when the valve to the airlock volume is opened, the UHV system pumps can generally snatch this gas away before it has time to adsorb onto the UHV surfaces. In a system well designed with suitable airlocks, the UHV components seldom need bakeout and the UHV may improve over time even as workpieces are introduced and removed.

=== Seals ===
All-metal seals are required for UHV chambers. These seals (i.e. CF flanges - see vacuum flange) have knife edges on both sides cutting into a soft, copper gasket. This metal-to-metal seal can maintain pressures down to 100 pPa (7.5×10^{−13} Torr). Although generally considered single use, a skilled operator can obtain several uses through the use of feeler gauges of decreasing size with each iteration, as long as the knife edges are in perfect condition. For SRF cavities, indium seals are more commonly used in sealing two flat surfaces together using clamps to bring the surfaces together. The clamps need to be tightened slowly to ensure the indium seals compress uniformly all around.

=== Material limitations ===
Many common materials are used sparingly if at all due to high vapor pressure, high adsorptivity or absorptivity resulting in subsequent troublesome outgassing, or high permeability in the face of differential pressure (i.e.: "through-gassing"):

- The majority of organic compounds cannot be used:
  - Plastics, other than PTFE and PEEK: plastics in other uses are replaced with ceramics or metals. Limited use of fluoroelastomers (such as Viton) and perfluoroelastomers (such as Kalrez) as gasket materials can be considered if metal gaskets are inconvenient, though these polymers can be expensive. Although through-gassing of elastomerics can not be avoided, experiments have shown that slow out-gassing of water vapor is, initially at least, the more important limitation. This effect can be minimized by pre-baking under medium vacuum. When selecting O-rings, permeation rate and permeation coefficients need to be considered. For example the penetration rate of nitrogen in Viton seals is 100 times lower than the penetration of nitrogen in silicon seals, which impacts the ultimate vacuum that can be achieved.
  - Glues: special glues for high vacuum must be used, generally epoxies with a high mineral filler content. Among the most popular of these include asbestos in the formulation. This allows for an epoxy with good initial properties and able to retain reasonable performance across multiple bake-outs.
- Some steels: due to oxidization of carbon steel, which greatly increases adsorption area, only stainless steel is used. Particularly, non-leaded and low-sulfur austenitic grades such as 304 and 316 are preferred. These steels include at least 18% chromium and 8% nickel. Variants of stainless steel include low-carbon grades (such as 304L and 316L), and grades with additives such as niobium and molybdenum to reduce the formation of chromium carbide (which provides no corrosion resistance). Common designations include 316L (low carbon), and 316LN (low carbon with nitrogen), which can boast a significantly lower magnetic permeability with special welding techniques making them preferable for particle accelerator applications. Chromium carbide precipitation at the grain boundaries can render a stainless steel less resistant to oxidation.
- Lead: Soldering is performed using lead-free solder. Occasionally pure lead is used as a gasket material between flat surfaces in lieu of a copper/knife edge system.
- Indium: Indium is sometimes used as a deformable gasket material for vacuum seals, especially in cryogenic apparatus, but its low melting point prevents use in baked systems. In a more esoteric application, the low melting point of Indium is taken advantage of as a renewable seal in high vacuum valves. These valves are used several times, generally with the aid of a torque wrench set to increasing torque with each iteration. When the indium seal is exhausted, it is melted and reforms itself and thus is ready for another round of uses.
- Zinc, cadmium: High vapor pressures during system bake-out virtually preclude their use.
- Aluminum: Although aluminum itself has a vapor pressure which makes it unsuitable for use in UHV systems, the same oxides which protect aluminum against corrosion improve its characteristics under UHV. Although initial experiments with aluminum suggested milling under mineral oil to maintain a thin, consistent layer of oxide, it has become increasingly accepted that aluminum is a suitable UHV material without special preparation. Paradoxically, aluminum oxide, especially when embedded as particles in stainless steel as for example from sanding in an attempt to reduce the surface area of the steel, is considered a problematic contaminant.
- Cleaning is very important for UHV. Common cleaning procedures include degreasing with detergents, organic solvents, or chlorinated hydrocarbons. Electropolishing is often used to reduce the surface area from which adsorbed gases can be emitted. Etching of stainless steel using hydrofluoric and nitric acid forms a chromium rich surface, followed by a nitric acid passivation step, which forms a chromium oxide rich surface. This surface retards the diffusion of hydrogen into the chamber.

Technical limitations:

- Screws: Threads have a high surface area and tend to "trap" gases, and therefore, are avoided. Blind holes are especially avoided, due to the trapped gas at the base of the screw and slow venting through the threads, which is commonly known as a "virtual leak". This can be mitigated by designing components to include through-holes for all threaded connections, or by using vented screws (which have a hole drilled through their central axis or a notch along the threads). Vented Screws allow trapped gases to flow freely from the base of the screw, eliminating virtual leaks and speeding up the pump-down process.
- Welding: Processes such as gas metal arc welding and shielded metal arc welding cannot be used, due to the deposition of impure material and potential introduction of voids or porosity. Gas tungsten arc welding (with an appropriate heat profile and properly selected filler material) is necessary. Other clean processes, such as electron beam welding or laser beam welding, are also acceptable; however, those that involve potential slag inclusions (such as submerged arc welding and flux-cored arc welding) are obviously not. To avoid trapping gas or high vapor pressure molecules, welds must fully penetrate the joint or be made from the interior surface, otherwise a virtual leak might appear.

=== UHV manipulator ===
A UHV manipulator allows an object which is inside a vacuum chamber and under vacuum to be mechanically positioned. It may provide rotary motion, linear motion, or a combination of both. The most complex devices give motion in three axes and rotations around two of those axes. To generate the mechanical movement inside the chamber, three basic mechanisms are commonly employed: a mechanical coupling through the vacuum wall (using a vacuum-tight seal around the coupling: a welded metal bellows for example), a magnetic coupling that transfers motion from air-side to vacuum-side: or a sliding seal using special greases of very low vapor pressure or ferromagnetic fluid. Such special greases can exceed USD $400 per kilogram. Various forms of motion control are available for manipulators, such as knobs, handwheels, motors, stepping motors, piezoelectric motors, and pneumatics. The use of motors in a vacuum environment often requires special design or other special considerations, as the convective cooling taken for granted under atmospheric conditions is not available in a UHV environment.

The manipulator or sample holder may include features that allow additional control and testing of a sample, such as the ability to apply heat, cooling, voltage, or a magnetic field. Sample heating can be accomplished by electron bombardment or thermal radiation. For electron bombardment, the sample holder is equipped with a filament which emits electrons when biased at a high negative potential. The impact of the electrons bombarding the sample at high energy causes it to heat. For thermal radiation, a filament is mounted close to the sample and resistively heated to high temperature. The infrared energy from the filament heats the sample.

== Typical uses ==
Ultra-high vacuum is necessary for many surface analytic techniques such as:

- X-ray photoelectron spectroscopy (XPS)
- Auger electron spectroscopy (AES)
- Secondary ion mass spectrometry (SIMS)
- Thermal desorption spectroscopy (TPD)
- Thin film growth and preparation techniques with stringent requirements for purity, such as molecular beam epitaxy (MBE), UHV chemical vapor deposition (CVD), atomic layer deposition (ALD) and UHV pulsed laser deposition (PLD)
- Angle resolved photoemission spectroscopy (ARPES)
- Field emission microscopy and Field ion microscopy
- Atom Probe Tomography (APT)

UHV is necessary for these applications to reduce surface contamination, by reducing the number of molecules reaching the sample over a given time period. At 0.1 millipascals (7.5×10^{−7} Torr), it only takes 1 second to cover a surface with a contaminant, so much lower pressures are needed for long experiments.

UHV is also required for:

- Particle accelerators The Large Hadron Collider (LHC) has three UH vacuum systems. The lowest pressure is found in the pipes the proton beam speeds through near the interaction (collision) points. Here helium cooling pipes also act as cryopumps. The maximum allowable pressure is 1×10^{−6} pascals (1.0×10^{−8} mbar)
- Gravitational wave detectors such as LIGO, VIRGO, GEO 600, and TAMA 300. The LIGO experimental apparatus is housed in a 10,000 cubic metres (350,000 cu ft) vacuum chamber at 1×10^{−7} pascals (1.0×10^{−9} mbar) in order to eliminate temperature fluctuations and sound waves which would jostle the mirrors far too much for gravitational waves to be sensed.
- Atomic physics experiments which use cold atoms, such as ion trapping or making Bose–Einstein condensates.

While not compulsory, it can prove beneficial in applications such as:

- Molecular beam epitaxy, E-beam evaporation, sputtering and other deposition techniques.
- Atomic force microscopy. High vacuum enables high Q factors on the cantilever oscillation.
- Scanning tunneling microscopy. High vacuum reduces oxidation and contamination, hence enables imaging and the achievement of atomic resolution on clean metal and semiconductor surfaces, e.g. imaging the surface reconstruction of the unoxidized silicon surface.
- Electron-beam lithography

== See also ==
- Journal of Vacuum Science and Technology
- Orders of magnitude (pressure)
- Vacuum engineering
- Vacuum gauge
- Vacuum state
