= Vacuum arc remelting =

Process of purifying metal ingots

Vacuum arc remelting (VAR) is a secondary melting process for production of metal ingots with elevated chemical and mechanical homogeneity for highly demanding applications. The VAR process has revolutionized the specialty traditional metallurgical techniques industry, and has made possible tightly controlled materials used in biomedical, aviation and aerospace.

== Overview ==
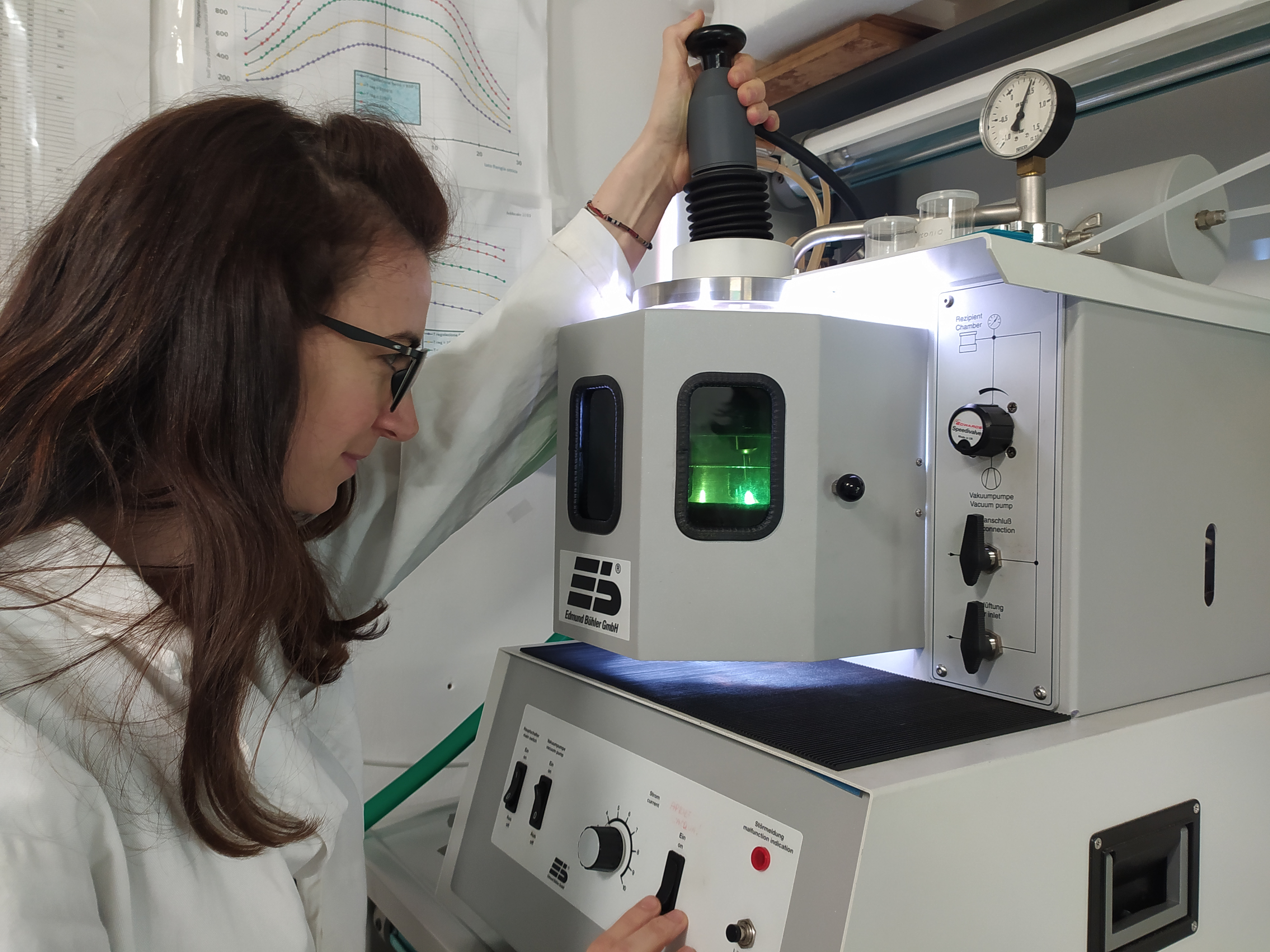
A vacuum arc remelting (VAR) furnace (or Arc Melter) from Edmund Bühler GmbH

VAR is used most frequently in high value applications. It is an additional processing step to improve the quality of metal. Because it is time consuming and expensive, a majority of commercial alloys do not employ the process. Nickel, titanium, and specialty steels are materials most often processed with this method. The conventional path for production of titanium alloys includes single, double or even triple VAR processing. Use of this technique over traditional methods presents several advantages:

- The solidification rate of molten material can be tightly controlled. This allows a high degree of control over the microstructure as well as the ability to minimize segregation
- The gases dissolved in liquid metal during melting metals in open furnaces, such as nitrogen, oxygen and hydrogen are considered to be detrimental to the majority of steels and alloys. Under vacuum conditions these gases escape from liquid metal.
- Elements with high vapor pressure such as carbon, sulfur, and magnesium (frequently contaminants) are lowered in concentration.
- Centerline porosity and segregation are eliminated.
- Certain metals and alloys, such as Ti, cannot be melted in open air furnaces

== Process description ==
Schematic of VAR apparatus

The alloy to undergo VAR is formed into a cylinder typically by vacuum induction melting (VIM) or ladle refining (airmelt). This cylinder, referred to as an electrode is then put into a large cylindrical enclosed crucible and brought to a metallurgical vacuum (0.001–0.1 mmHg or 0.1–13.3 Pa). At the bottom of the crucible is a small amount of the alloy to be remelted, which the top electrode is brought close to prior to starting the melt. Several kiloamperes of DC current are used to start an arc between the two pieces, thus a continuous melt is derived. The crucible (typically made of copper) is surrounded by a water jacket to cool the melt and control the solidification rate. To prevent arcing between the electrode and the crucible walls, the diameter of the crucible is larger than the electrode. As a result, the electrode must be lowered as the melt consumes it. Control of the current, cooling water, and electrode gap is essential to effective control of the process and production of defect-free material.

Ideally, the melt rate stays constant throughout the process cycle, but monitoring and control of the vacuum arc remelting process is not simple. This is because there is a complex heat transfer occurring involving conduction, radiation, convection within the liquid metal, and advection caused by the Lorentz force. Ensuring the consistency of the melt process in terms of pool geometry, and melt rate is crucial in ensuring the best possible properties of the alloy.

== Materials and applications ==
The VAR process is used on many different materials. Certain applications almost always use a material that has been VAR treated. A list of materials that may be VAR treated include:

- Stainless Steel
  - 15-5
  - 13-8
  - 17-4
  - 304
  - 316
- Alloy Steel
  - 9310
  - 4340 & 4330+V
  - 300M
  - AF1410
  - Aermet 100
  - M50
  - BG42
  - Nitralloy
  - 16NCD13
  - 35NCD16
  - HY-100
  - HY-180
  - HY-TUF
  - D6AC
  - Maraging steels
  - UT-18
  - HP 9-4-30
- Titanium
  - Ti-6Al-4V
  - Ti-10V-2Al-3Fe
  - Ti-5Al-5V-5Mo-3Cr
- Invar
- Nitinol
- Nickel superalloys
  - Inconel alloys
  - Hastelloy alloys
  - Rene alloys
  - RR1000
- Zirconium
- Niobium
- Platinum
- Tantalum
- Rhodium

Note that pure titanium and most titanium alloys are double or triple VAR processed. Nickel-based super alloys for aerospace applications are usually VAR processed. Zirconium and niobium alloys used in the nuclear industry are routinely VAR processed. Pure platinum, tantalum, and rhodium may be VAR processed.

== Applications ==
VAR-processed materials are used in applications where component failure would have severe consequences, and where the highest levels of material purity and structural integrity are required.

=== Aerospace ===
The aerospace industry is the largest consumer of VAR-processed materials. VAR-refined superalloys and titanium alloys are used in jet engine components, including turbine blades and turbine disks, which must withstand extreme temperatures and mechanical stresses. Ti-6Al-4V, the most widely used titanium alloy in aerospace, is routinely double or triple VAR-processed to achieve the purity levels required for critical structural components such as landing gear, airframe structures, and engine parts.

=== Medical ===
VAR-processed titanium and cobalt-chromium alloys are used in medical implants, including hip and knee replacement prostheses, dental implants, and pacemaker components. The high purity achieved through VAR processing ensures biocompatibility and reduces the risk of adverse reactions in the human body.

=== Power generation ===
Nickel-based superalloys processed through VAR are used in gas turbines for power generation, where components must maintain their mechanical properties at elevated operating temperatures.

=== Nuclear ===
Zirconium alloys used as fuel cladding in nuclear reactors are routinely VAR-processed to ensure the material integrity required for safe reactor operation.

== See also ==
- Electro-slag remelting
- Vacuum arc
- Vacuum metallurgy
