= Vacuum induction melting =

Metallurgical process

Vacuum induction melting (VIM) utilizes electric currents to melt metal within a vacuum. The first prototype was developed in 1920. Induction heating induces eddy currents within conductors. Eddy currents create heating effects to melt the metal. Vacuum induction melting has been used in both the aerospace and nuclear industries.

== History ==
The process was invented in Hanau, Germany in 1917. Heraeus Vacuumschmelze and Dr. Wilhelm Rohn applied for a patent on vacuum melting on 12 January 1918 and were granted a German patent DE 345161.

Edwin Fitch Northrup built the first prototype of a vacuum induction furnace in the United States of America in 1920.

Medium frequency furnaces were seen soon afterwards in England and Sweden in 1927.

The process was initially developed to refine certain special metals such as cobalt and nickel. As these metals and alloys became more common, the vacuum induction melting (VIM) process became more widely adopted.

VIM now helps to melt a variety of metals for aircraft and nuclear applications.

== Procedure ==
VIM involves placing a core-less induction furnace into a vacuum chamber. The melting and casting operations are carried out at low pressures to control the entire alloy chemistry process.

== Uses ==
VIM is used in particular for producing alloys with melting points beyond those practical for other kinds of melting. Nickel, nickel-iron, and superalloys are frequently produced using this process. The VIM process is often used for small batch sizes and allows for a high level of control over the composition of the alloy. There is low environmental contamination (dust etc.) and oxidation, while elements that are often undesired such as hydrogen or nitrogen can be removed from the process.
