= Hydraulic (disambiguation) =

Hydraulics is a topic in engineering dealing with the mechanical properties of liquids.

Hydraulic may also refer to:

== Business ==
- London Hydraulic Power Company, a London, England power company, closed in 1977

== Engineering ==
- Hydraulic circuit, a system comprising an interconnected set of discrete components that transport liquid
- Hydraulic diameter, a commonly used term when handling flow in non-circular tubes and channels
- Hydraulic engineering, a sub-discipline of civil engineering, concerned with the flow and conveyance of fluids, principally water and sewage
- Hydraulic fracturing, a well-stimulation technique in which rock is fractured by a pressurized liquid
  - Hydraulic fracturing by country
- Hydraulic intensifier, a hydraulic machine for transforming hydraulic power at low pressure into a reduced volume at higher pressure
- Hydraulic jump, a phenomenon frequently observed in rivers and spillways, when liquid at high velocity discharges into a zone of lower velocity, and a rather abrupt rise occurs in the liquid surface
- Hydraulic mining, a form of mining that uses high-pressure jets of water to dislodge rock material or move sediment
- Hydraulic power (disambiguation)
- Hydraulic power network, a system of interconnected pipes carrying pressurized liquid used to transmit mechanical power from a power source, like a pump, to hydraulic equipment like lifts or motors
- Hydraulic resistance (disambiguation)
- Hydraulic transmission (disambiguation)
- Hydropower, hydraulic energy

== Equipment ==
- Breaker (hydraulic), a powerful percussion hammer fitted to an excavator for demolishing concrete structures or rocks
- Electro-hydraulic systems, used for power steering
- Hydraulic accumulator, a pressure storage reservoir in which a non-compressible hydraulic fluid is held under pressure by an external source
- Hydraulic brake, an arrangement of braking mechanism which uses brake fluid, typically containing ethylene glycol, to transfer pressure from the controlling mechanism to the braking mechanism
- Hydraulic cement, cement distinguished by its reactivity with water, versus carbon dioxide
- Hydraulic cylinder, (also called a linear hydraulic motor), a mechanical actuator that is used to give a unidirectional force through a unidirectional stroke
- Hydraulic debarker, a machine removing bark from wooden logs by the use of water under pressure
- Hydraulic drive system, a drive or transmission system that uses pressurized hydraulic fluid to power hydraulic machinery
- Hydraulic fill, an embankment or other fill in which the materials are deposited in place by a flowing stream of water
- Hydraulic fluid, the medium by which power is transferred in hydraulic machinery
- Hydraulic head, or piezometric head, a specific measurement of liquid pressure above a geodetic datum
- Hydraulic lift, a type of hydraulic machinery or a form of hydraulic redistribution, a plant root phenomenon
- Hydraulic lime, a general term for varieties of lime (calcium oxide), or slaked lime (calcium hydroxide), used to make lime mortar which set through hydration: thus they are called hydraulic
- Hydraulic machinery, machinery and tools that use liquid fluid power to do simple work. Heavy equipment is a common example
- Hydraulic manifold, a manifold that regulates fluid flow between pumps and actuators and other components in a hydraulic system
- Hydraulic motor, a mechanical actuator that converts hydraulic pressure and flow into torque and angular displacement (rotation)
- Hydraulic press, a device (see machine press) using a hydraulic cylinder to generate a compressive force
- Hydraulic pressure switch, a pressure switch with applications in automobiles
- Hydraulic ram, a cyclic water pump powered by hydropower
- Hydraulic rescue tools, used by emergency rescue personnel to assist vehicle extrication of crash victims, as well as other rescues from small spaces
- Hydraulic seal, a relatively soft, non-metallic ring, captured in a groove or fixed in a combination of rings, forming a seal assembly, to block or separate fluid in reciprocating motion applications
- Hydraulic structure, a structure submerged or partially submerged in any body of water, which disrupts the natural flow of water
- Hydraulic tappet, a device for maintaining zero valve clearance in an internal combustion engine
- Hydraulic telegraph, either of two different hydraulic-telegraph telecommunication systems

== Places ==
- Hydraulic, Virginia, an unincorporated community in Albemarle County, Virginia
- Hydraulic, a locality in the Cariboo Land District of British Columbia

== Politics ==
- Hydraulic empire, a political structure which maintains power through exclusive control over access to water

== Arts and media ==
- Hydraulic (Transformers), a fictional character, member of the Micromasters

== Science ==
- Hydraulic analogy, the most widely used analogy for "electron fluid" in a metal conductor
- Hydraulic action, erosion that occurs when the motion of water against a rock surface produces mechanical weathering
- Hydraulic conductivity, a property of vascular plants, soils and rocks, that describes the ease with which a fluid (usually water) can move through pore spaces or fractures
- Hydraulic lift, a type of hydraulic machinery or a form of hydraulic redistribution, a plant root phenomenon
- Hydraulic redistribution, a plant root phenomenon
- Hydraulic retention time, a measure of the average length of time that a compound (ex. water) remains in a storage unit (ex. lake, pond, ocean)

== Vehicles ==
- Hydraulic hybrid, a vehicle that uses a pressurized fluid power source, along with a conventional internal combustion engine
- USS Hydraulic (SP-2584), a US Navy patrol vessel

== Biology ==
- Hydraulic model of aggression, described by Konrad Lorenz in his 1963 book On Aggression
