= Plunger (hydraulics) =

Device used in Hydraulics

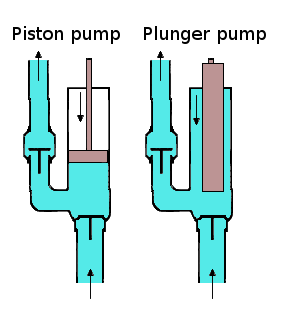
Piston pump (left) compared to plunger pump (right)

A plunger is a cylindrical rod used to transmit hydraulic compression force. It is characterized by its length being much greater than its diameter, and it is thus distinguished from a regular piston (where the working surface is larger than the thickness of the rod, i.e. more like a disk).

They are mainly used as part of certain types of pumps and hydraulic machines. Plungers are used for fluid-mechanical power transmission in pumps (plunger pumps), hydraulic gearboxes, high-pressure diesel injection pumps, hydraulic workshop presses and jacks, and other equipment, and are distinguished in fluid mechanics by being a piston without moving seals. The seals are instead located in the wall through which the plunger slides (as opposed to piston rings on a piston).

Plungers are often supplied with a suitable stationary plunger bushing that fits tightly against the plunger (together they are called a plunger pair), and together these form a seal that can withstand high pressures. Compared to a piston that has to act against a cylinder wall, it is easier to manufacture a plunger to close tolerances against a plunger bushing (since the plunger has a cylindrical shape). Some define a plunger as a type of piston that is also its own piston rod. Plunger pumps are often used to pump slurries such as sludge or liquid cement.

An advantage compared to classic pistons is the simplicity of manufacture (since the plunger is a simple rod) and the relatively easy use of a plunger bushing for sealing. Another advantage is resistance to dirt. Thanks to the simple shape, dirt has no place to stick, unlike a classic piston.

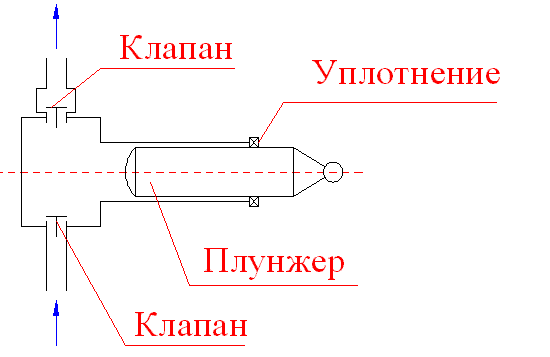
Plunger (note the cylindrical shape along the entire working length)

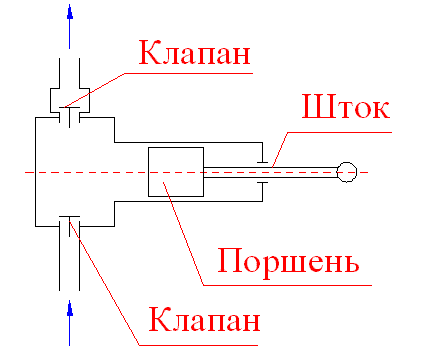
Piston (note the thin piston rod, and the short piston compared to the working length)

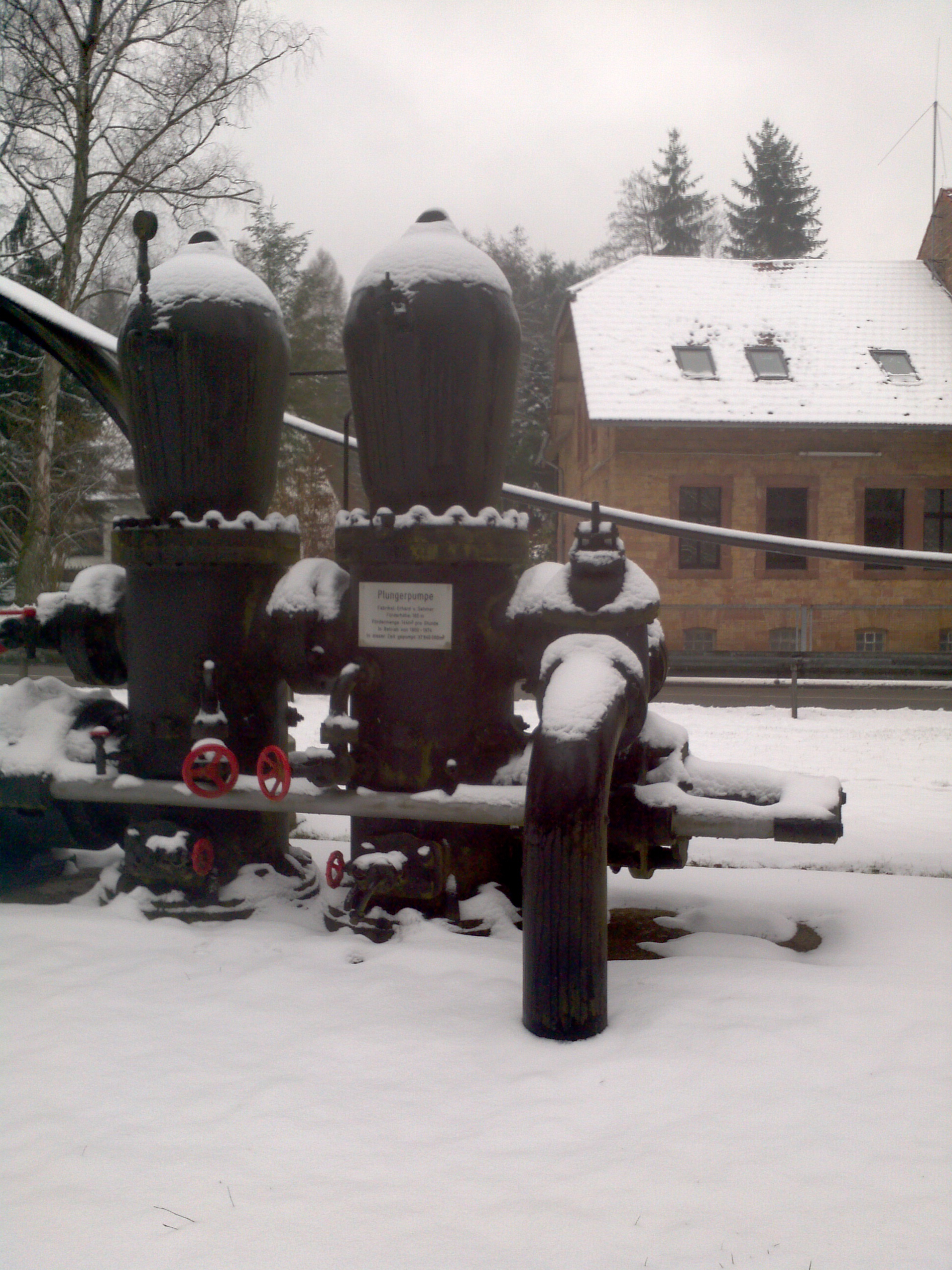
Plunger pump for water pumping station (Germany)

Unlike a piston (where the seal is on the piston rings), the seal of a plunger is located in the cylinder wall, and when the plunger performs a reciprocating motion, the plunger surface thus moves along the seal. Plungers are mainly used in hydraulic axial piston pumps, radial piston pumps and piston pumps. They have also become widespread in fuel supply systems for diesel engines (injection pumps) in pairs of plungers.

== Plunger pump ==
Plunger pumps are capable of operating at higher pressures than piston pumps. The reason for this is that plungers require high precision on its outer cylindrical surface, while piston pumps require more precise machining of the inner surface of the cylinder, which is technically more difficult to achieve.

The volume of the displaced medium depends directly on the stroke length of the plunger. By changing the pump stroke length, the flow rate will be adjusted.

The precision achieved on modern plunger and rotary hydraulic plunger machines is so high that the distance between the inner and outer cylindrical surfaces of plunger pairs reaches 2-3 micrometres (0.002-0.003 mm).

The pressure that plunger pairs can withstand is very high. During fuel injection in diesel engines, the pressure in the plunger pair can reach 200 megapascals (MPa).

== Plunger lift ==
The term "plunger" is also used in pipelines. Here, the plunger is a movable control element in a control valve whose movement changes the volume flow.
