= Reciprocating pump =

Class of positive-displacement pumps

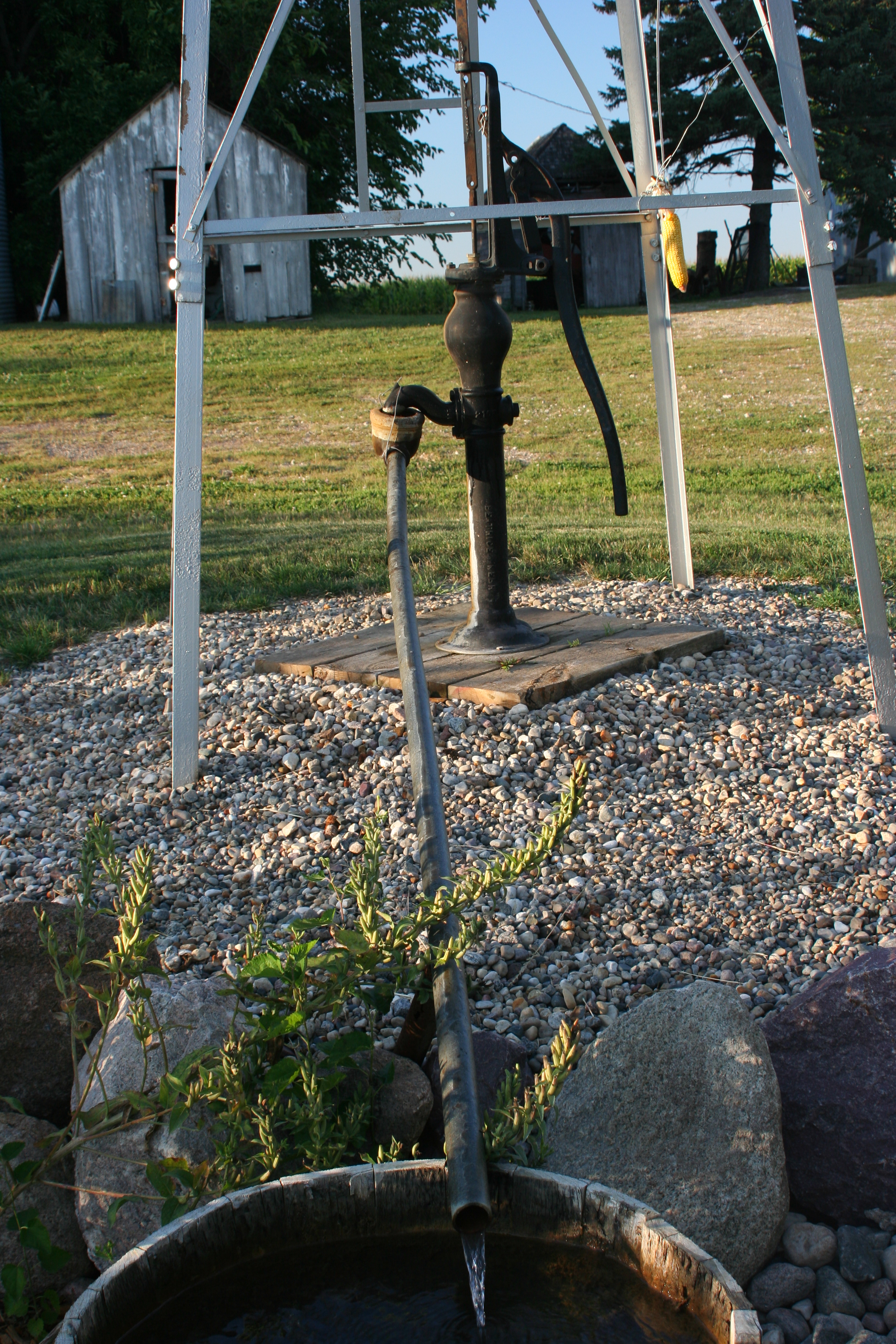
Reciprocating pump attached to a Windmill on a farm.

A reciprocating pump is a class of positive-displacement pumps that includes the piston pump, plunger pump, and diaphragm pump. Well maintained, reciprocating pumps can last for decades. Unmaintained, however, they can succumb to wear and tear. It is often used where a relatively small quantity of liquid is to be handled and where delivery pressure is quite large. In reciprocating pumps, the chamber that traps the liquid is a stationary cylinder that contains a piston or plunger.

== Types ==
By source of work

- Simple hand-operated reciprocating pump. The simplest example is the bicycle pump, which is used ubiquitously to inflate bicycle tires and various types of sporting balls.
- Power-operated deep well reciprocating pump

By mechanism

- Single-acting reciprocating pump consists of a piston of which only one side engages the fluid being displaced. The simplest example would be a syringe.
- Double-acting reciprocating pump engage with both sides of the piston, each stroke of the piston carries out both suction and expulsion at the same time. Thus it require two inflow pipes and two outflow pipes.

== Main components of reciprocating pump ==
The basic parts of a reciprocating pump, along with their functions, are as follows;

- Water reservoir - it is not a part of reciprocating pump, however, it is the main source where from the reciprocating pump takes the water. It may be a source of other fluid as well.
- Strainer - It removes all impurities from the liquid to avert chocking the pump.
- Suction Pipe - It is a pipe by which pump takes the water from the reservoir.
- Suction Valve - It is a non-return type valve installed on the suction pipe and helps to flow from reservoir to pump not the vice versa.
- Cylinder or liquid cylinder - The main component where pressure is increased. It is a hollow cylinder with coatings. It consists of a piston along with piston rings.
- Piston or plunger and Piston rod - Piston is directly connected to a rod that is the piston rod. This piston rod is again connected to the connecting rod. Piston makes the reciprocating motion in forward and backward motion and creates pressure inside the cylinder.
- Piston rings - Piston rings are small but one of the vital parts to protect the piston surface as well as cylinder inner surface from wear and tear. It helps to operate the pump smoothly.
- Packing - Packing is necessary for all pumps, to have a proper sealing between cylinder and piston. It helps to stop leakage.
- Crank and Connecting rod - Crank is connected to the power source and connecting rod makes connection between crank and piston rod. These component helps to change the circular motion into linear motion.
- Delivery valve (non-return valve) - Like suction valve delivery valve is also non return type and it helps to build up the pressure. It protect the pump from back flow.
- Delivery pipe - It helps to supply the fluid at destination.
- Air Vessel - Few reciprocating pumps may have an air vessel, it helps to reduce the frictional head or acceleration head.

== Reciprocating Pump Application ==
Application of Reciprocating pumps, are as follows:

- Vessel, pipe, tank, tube, condensate pipe, heat exchanger etc. cleaning,
- Oil drilling, refineries, production, disposal, injections.
- Pneumatic pressure applications.
- Vehicle cleaning.
- Sewer line cleaning.
- Wet sandblasting
- Boiler feeding
- High-pressure pumps for the RO system (Reverse osmosis)
- Hydro testing of tanks, vessels, etc.
- Firefighting system.
- Wastewater treatment system.

== Examples ==
Examples of reciprocating pumps include

- Wind mill water and oil pump
- Hand pump
- Axial piston pump
