= Plunger (disambiguation) =

A plunger is a device that is used to release stoppages in plumbing.

Plunger may also refer to:

== Science and technology ==
- Plunger or blasting machine, used to detonate explosives
- Plunger (hydraulics), a cylindrical piston-like component whose length is larger than its diameter
  - Plunger, a component of a syringe (though in modern syringes, it is actually a piston)
  - Plunger pump, type of positive displacement pump with stationary seal and a smooth cylindrical plunger, suitable for higher pressures
  - Plunger suspension, used on motorcycles before and immediately after World War II
- Plunger brake or spoon brake, probably the first type of bicycle brake
- Plunger lift, a natural gas well deliquification techniques
- Plunger mute, the rubber part of a plumbing plunger, or a similar device, used as a musical mute
- Spring plunger, spring-loaded device for indexing, locating, positioning or locking components against a tip, pin, or ball using spring force
  - Plunger (pinball), a spring-loaded rod used to launch balls in pinball

== Military ==
- USS Plunger, four United States Navy submarines
- Plunger-class submarine, an early class of United States Navy submarines
- The Plungers, an obsolete nickname for the Household Cavalry

== Popular culture ==
- The Plunger, a 1920 American film

== See also ==
- French press or coffee plunger, a simple coffee brewing device
- Plunge (disambiguation)
