= Extrusion =

Process of pushing material through a die to create long symmetrical-shaped objects

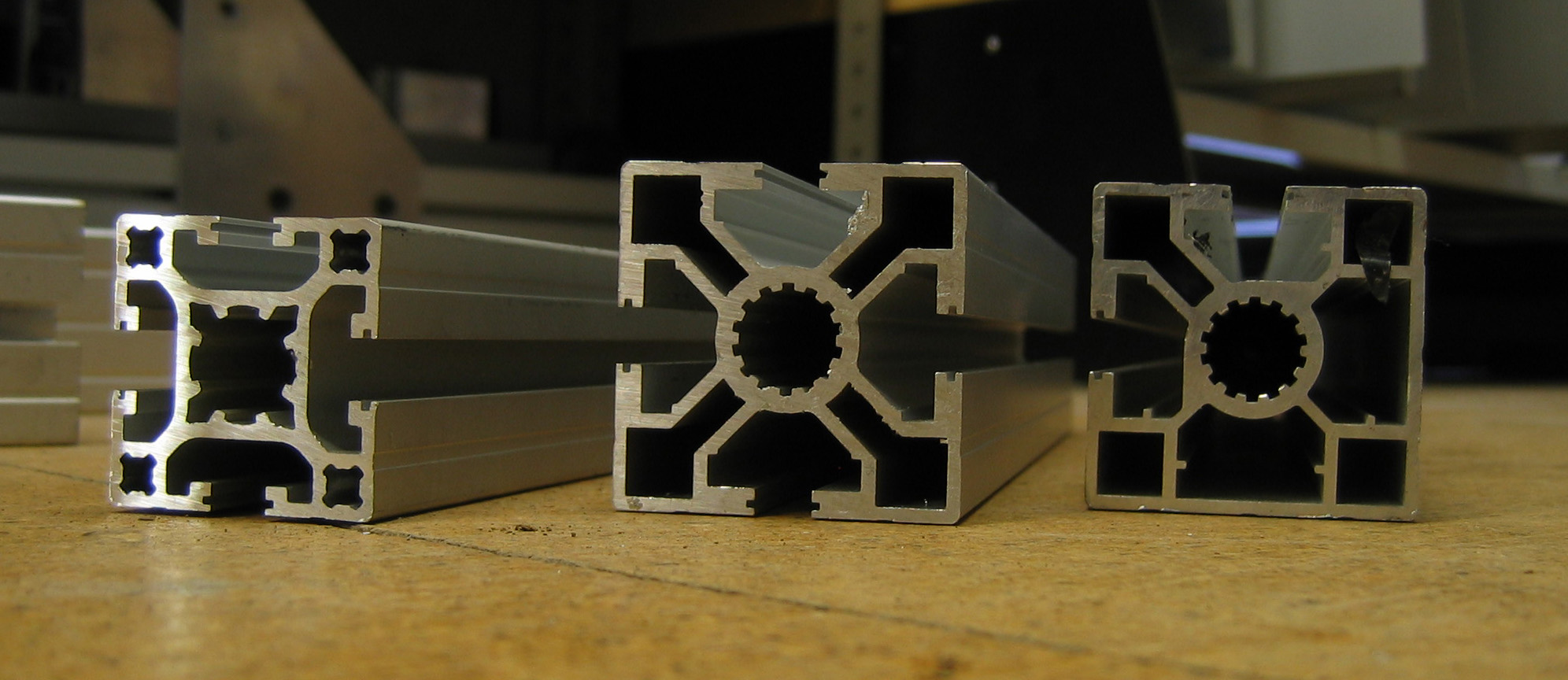
Extruded aluminum with several hollow cavities; T slots allow bars to be joined with special connectors.

Extrusion is a process used to create objects of a fixed cross-sectional profile by pushing material through a die of the desired cross-section. Its two main advantages over other manufacturing processes are its ability to create very complex cross-sections; and to work materials that are brittle, because the material encounters only compressive and shear stresses. It also creates excellent surface finish and gives considerable freedom of form in the design process.

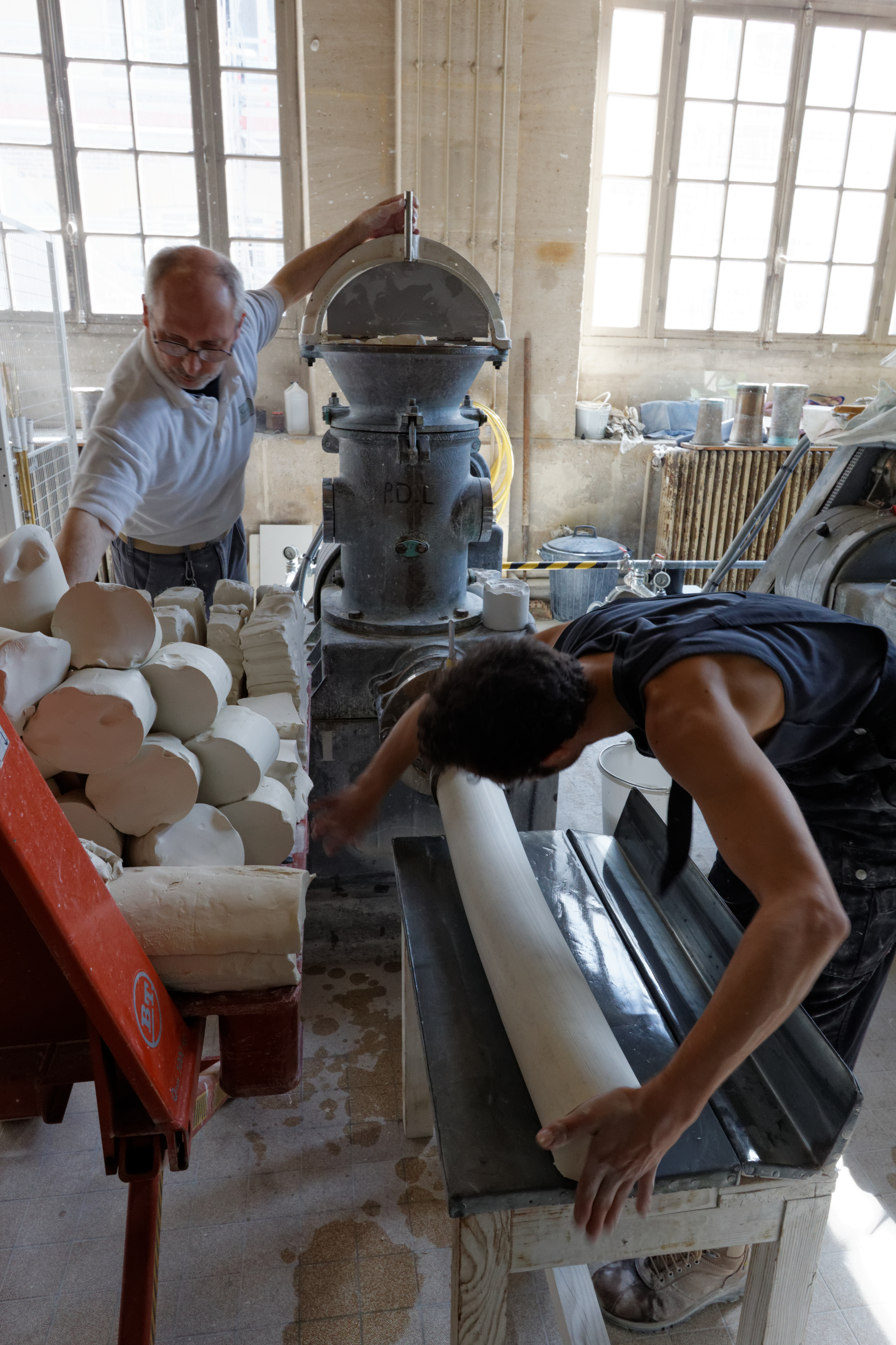
Clay body being extruded from a de-airing pug

Drawing is a similar process, using the tensile strength of the material to pull it through the die. It limits the amount of change that can be performed in one step, so it is limited to simpler shapes, and multiple stages are usually needed. Drawing is the main way to produce wire. Metal bars and tubes are also often drawn.

Extrusion may be continuous (theoretically producing indefinitely long material) or semi-continuous (producing many pieces). It can be done with hot or cold material. Commonly extruded materials include metals, polymers, ceramics, concrete, modelling clay, and foodstuffs. Products of extrusion are generally called extrudates.

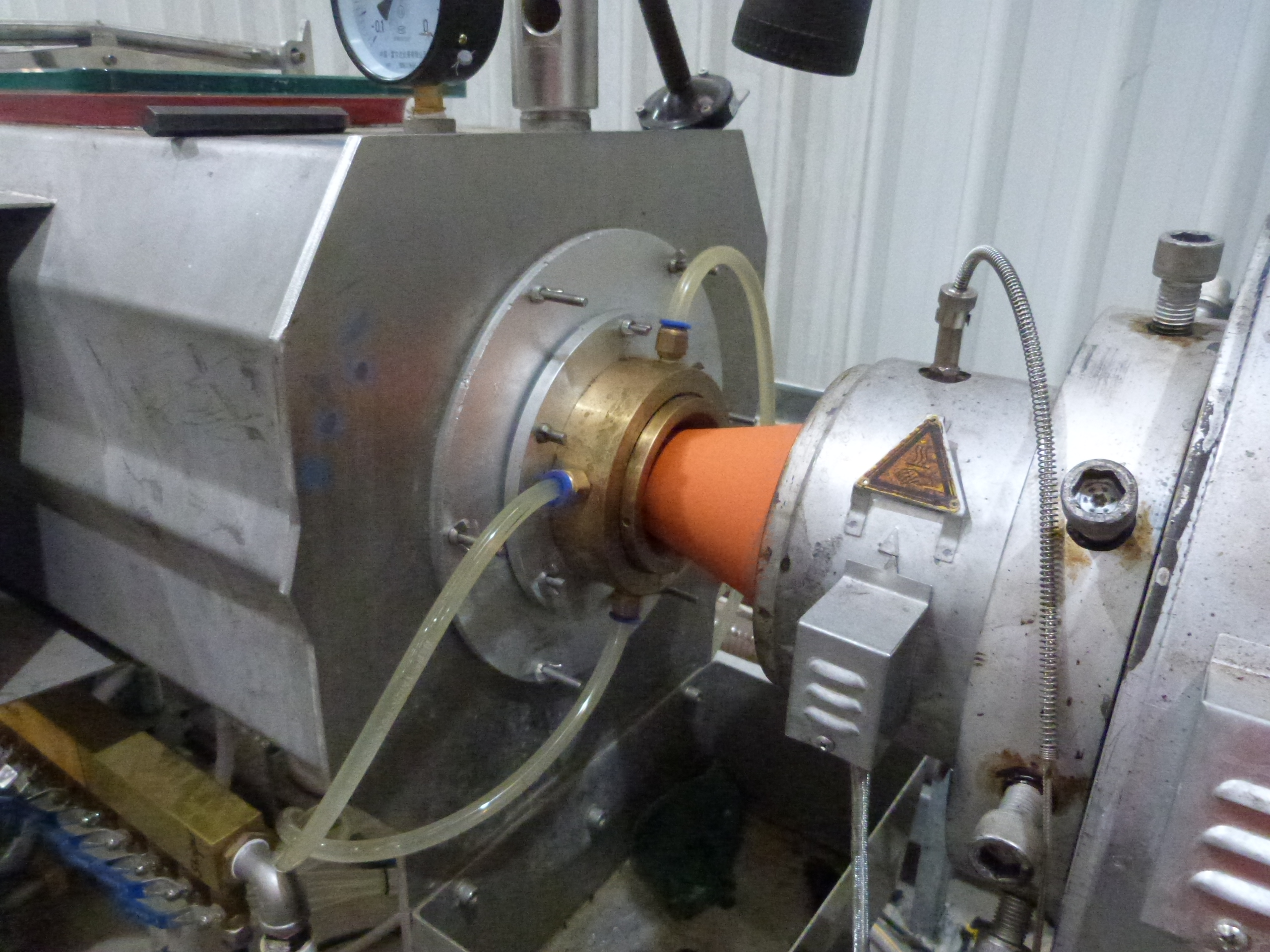
HDPE pipe during extrusion. The HDPE material is coming from the heater, into the die, then into the cooling tank. This Acu-Power conduit pipe is co-extruded - black inside with a thin orange jacket, to designate power cables.

Also referred to as "hole flanging", hollow cavities within extruded material cannot be produced using a simple flat extrusion die, because there would be no way to support the center barrier of the die. Instead, the die assumes the shape of a block with depth, beginning first with a shape profile that supports the center section. The die shape then internally changes along its length into the final shape, with the suspended center pieces supported from the back of the die. The material flows around the supports and fuses to create the desired closed shape.

The extrusion of metals can also increase their strength.

== History ==
In 1797, Joseph Bramah patented the first extrusion process for making pipe out of soft metals. It involved preheating the metal and then forcing it through a die via a hand-driven plunger. In 1820 Thomas Burr implemented that process for lead pipe, with a hydraulic press (also invented by Joseph Bramah). At that time the process was called "squirting". In 1894, Alexander Dick expanded the extrusion process to copper and brass alloys. Harder materials like steel started being extruded in 1951, while titanium extrusion was developed during the 1960s and 1970s.

== Types of extrusions ==
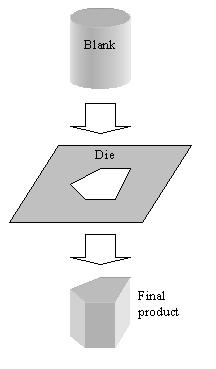
Extrusion of a round metal through a die

The process begins by heating the stock material (for hot or warm extrusion). It is then loaded into the container in the press. A dummy block is placed behind it where the ram then presses on the material to push it out of the die. Afterward the extrusion is stretched in order to straighten it. If better properties are required then it may be heat treated or cold worked.

The extrusion ratio is defined as the starting cross-sectional area divided by the cross-sectional area of the final extrusion. One of the main advantages of the extrusion process is that this ratio can be very large while still producing quality parts.

=== Hot extrusion ===
Hot extrusion is a hot working process, which means it is done above the material's recrystallization temperature to keep the material from work hardening and to make it easier to push the material through the die. Most hot extrusions are done on horizontal hydraulic presses that range from 230 to 11,000 metric tons (250 to 12,130 short tons). Pressures range from 30 to 700 MPa (4,400 to 101,500 psi), therefore lubrication is required, which can be oil or graphite for lower temperature extrusions, or glass powder for higher temperature extrusions. The biggest disadvantage of this process is its cost for machinery and its upkeep.

Hot extrusion temperature for various metals
Material	Temperature [°C (°F)]
Magnesium	350–450 (650–850)
Aluminium	350–500 (650–900)
Copper	600–1,100 (1,200–2,000)
Steel	1,200–1,300 (2,200–2,400)
Titanium	700–1,200 (1,300–2,100)
Nickel	1,000–1,200 (1,900–2,200)
Refractory alloys	up to 2,000 (4,000)

The extrusion process is generally economical when producing between several kilograms (pounds) and many tons, depending on the material being extruded. There is a crossover point where roll forming becomes more economical. For instance, some steels become more economical to roll if producing more than 20,000 kg (50,000 lb).

Aluminum hot extrusion die

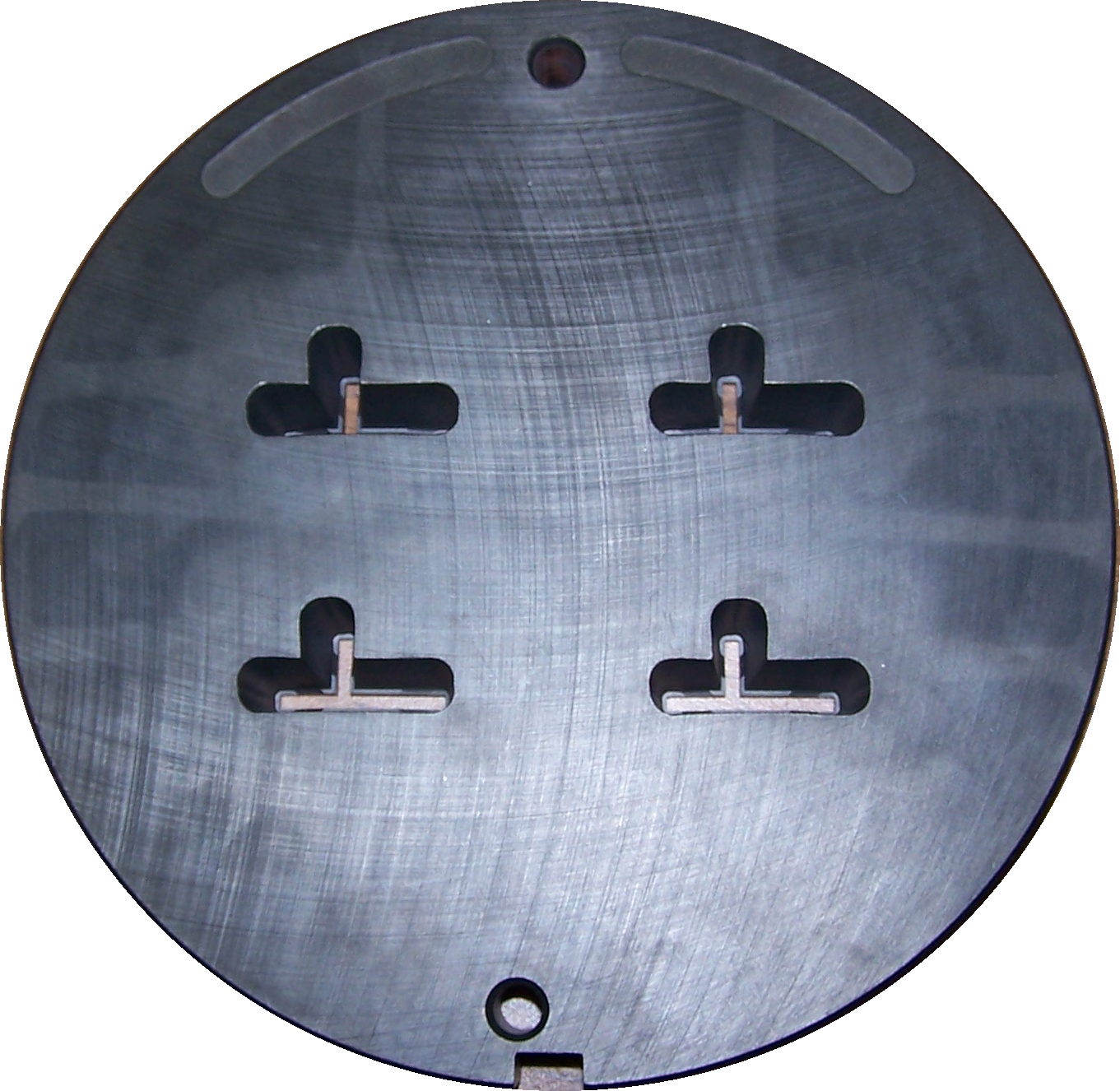
Front side of a four-family die. The die is 228 mm (9.0 in) in diameter.

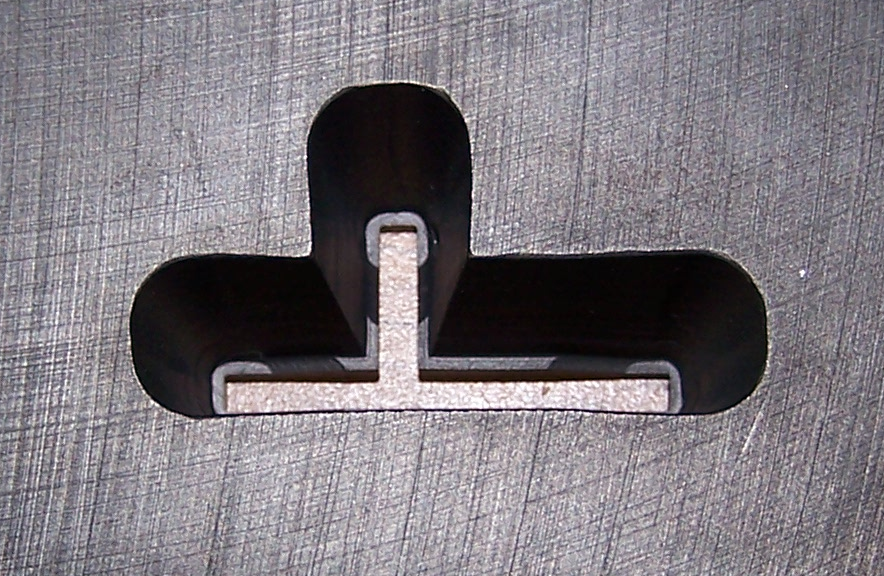
Close up of the shape cut into the die. The walls are drafted and the back wall thickness varies.

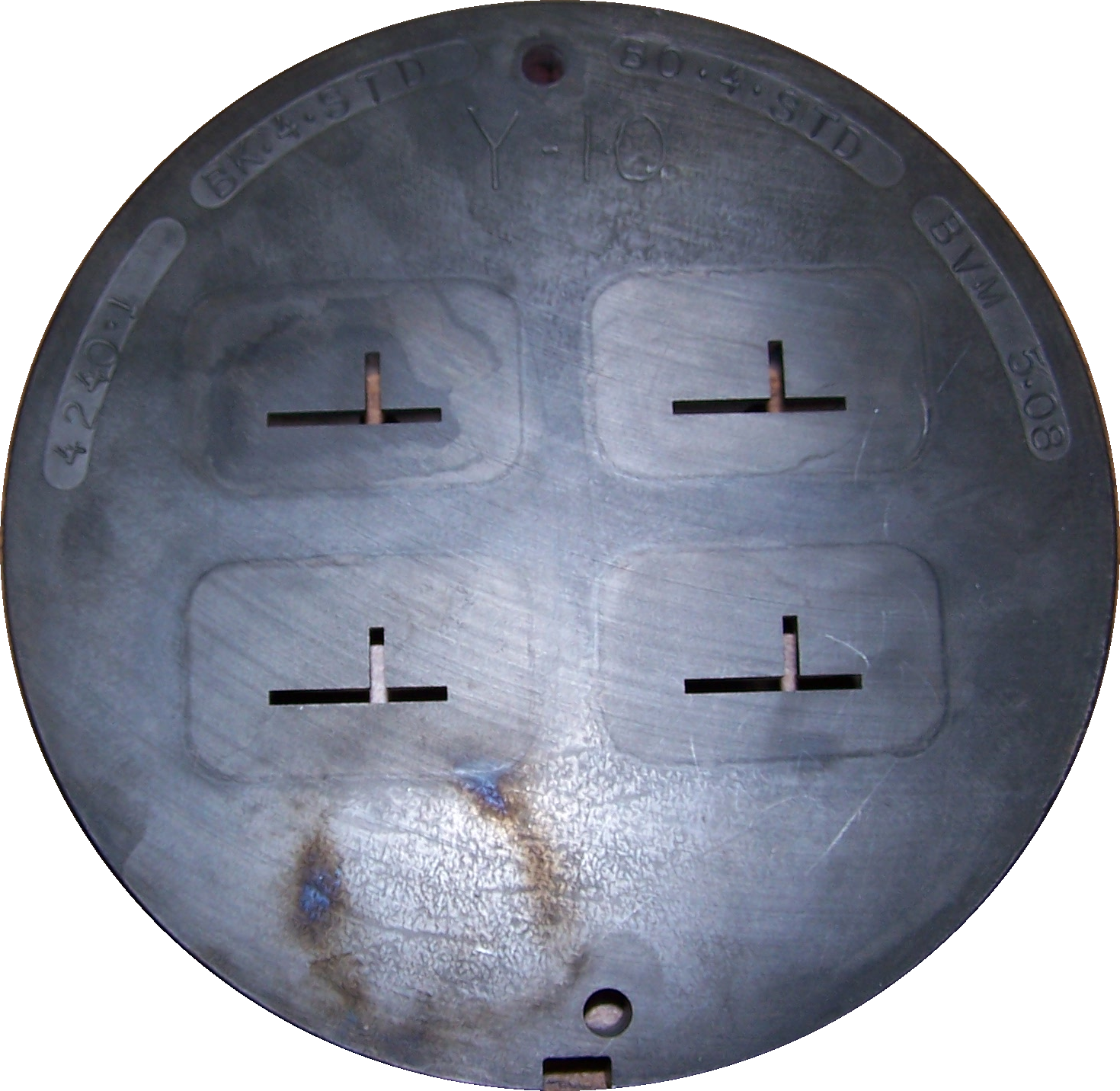
Back side of die. The wall thickness of the extrusion is 3 mm (0.12 in).

=== Cold extrusion ===
Cold extrusion is done at room temperature or near room temperature. The advantages of this over hot extrusion are the lack of oxidation, higher strength due to cold working, closer tolerances, better surface finish, and fast extrusion speeds if the material is subject to hot shortness.

Materials that are commonly cold extruded include: lead, tin, aluminum, copper, zirconium, titanium, molybdenum, beryllium, vanadium, niobium, and steel.

Examples of products produced by this process are: collapsible tubes, fire extinguisher cases, shock absorber cylinders and gear blanks.

=== Warm extrusion ===
In March 1956, a US patent was filed for "process for warm extrusion of metal". Patent US3156043 A outlines that a number of important advantages can be achieved with warm extrusion of both ferrous and non-ferrous metals and alloys if a billet to be extruded is changed in its physical properties in response to physical forces by being heated to a temperature below the critical melting point. Warm extrusion is done above room temperature, but below the recrystallization temperature of the material the temperatures ranges from 800 to 1,800 °F (424 to 975 °C). It is usually used to achieve the proper balance of required forces, ductility and final extrusion properties.

=== Friction extrusion ===
Friction extrusion was invented at the Welding Institute in the UK and patented in 1991. It was originally intended primarily as a method for production of homogeneous microstructures and particle distributions in metal matrix composite materials. Friction extrusion differs from conventional extrusion in that the charge (billet or other precursor) rotates relative to the extrusion die. An extrusion force is applied so as to push the charge against the die. In practice either the die or the charge may rotate or they may be counter-rotating. The relative rotary motion between the charge and the die has several significant effects on the process. First, the relative motion in the plane of rotation leads to large shear stresses, hence, plastic deformation in the layer of charge in contact with and near the die. This plastic deformation is dissipated by recovery and recrystallization processes leading to substantial heating of the deforming charge. Because of the deformation heating, friction extrusion does not generally require preheating of the charge by auxiliary means potentially resulting in a more energy efficient process. Second, the substantial level of plastic deformation in the region of relative rotary motion can promote solid state welding of powders or other finely divided precursors, such as flakes and chips, effectively consolidating the charge (friction consolidation) prior to extrusion.

=== Micro-extrusion ===
Micro-extrusion is a micro-forming extrusion process performed at the submillimeter range. Like extrusion, metal is pushed through a die orifice, but the resulting product's cross section can fit through a 1 mm square. Several micro-extrusion processes have been developed since micro-forming was envisioned in 1990. Forward (ram and billet move in the same direction) and backward (ram and billet move in the opposite direction) micro-extrusion was first introduced, with forward rod-backward cup and double cup extrusion methods developing later. Regardless of method, one of the greatest challenges of creating a successful micro-extrusion machine is the manufacture of the die and ram. "The small size of the die and ram, along with the stringent accuracy requirement, needs suitable manufacturing processes." Additionally, as Fu and Chan pointed out in a 2013 state-of-the-art technology review, several issues must still be resolved before micro-extrusion and other micro-forming technologies can be implemented more widely, including deformation load and defects, forming system stability, mechanical properties, and other size-related effects on the crystallite (grain) structure and boundaries.

== Equipment ==
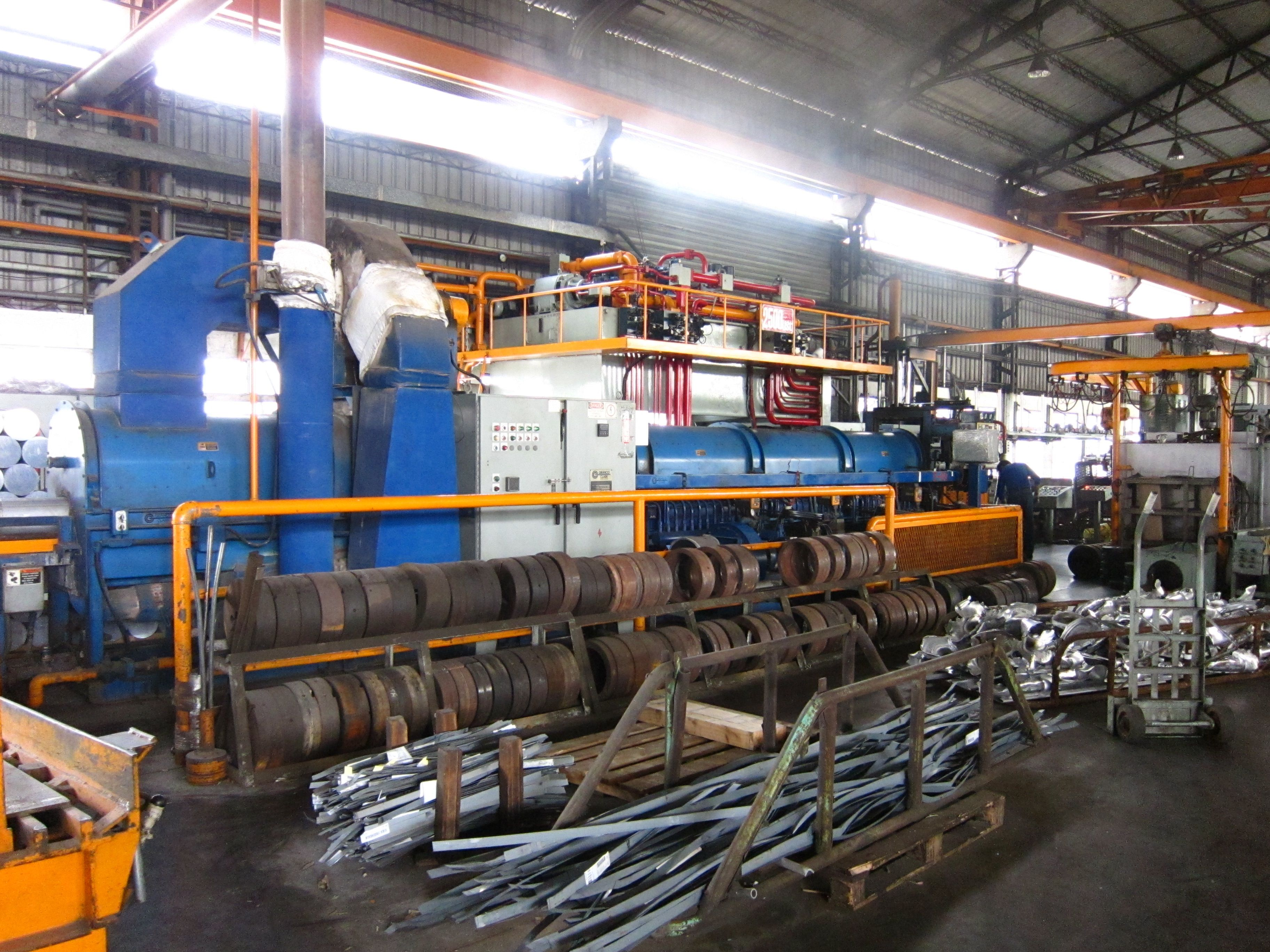
A horizontal hydraulic press for hot aluminum extrusion (loose dies and scrap visible in foreground)

There are many different variations of extrusion equipment. They vary by four major characteristics:

- Movement of the extrusion with relation to the ram. If the die is held stationary and the ram moves towards it then it is called "direct extrusion". If the ram is held stationary and the die moves towards the ram it is called "indirect extrusion".
- The position of the press, either vertical or horizontal
- The type of drive, either hydraulic or mechanical
- The type of load applied, either conventional (variable) or hydrostatic

A single or twin-screw auger, powered by an electric motor, or a ram, driven by hydraulic pressure (often used for steel and titanium alloys), oil pressure (for aluminum), or in other specialized processes such as rollers inside a perforated drum for the production of many simultaneous streams of material.

=== Forming internal cavities ===
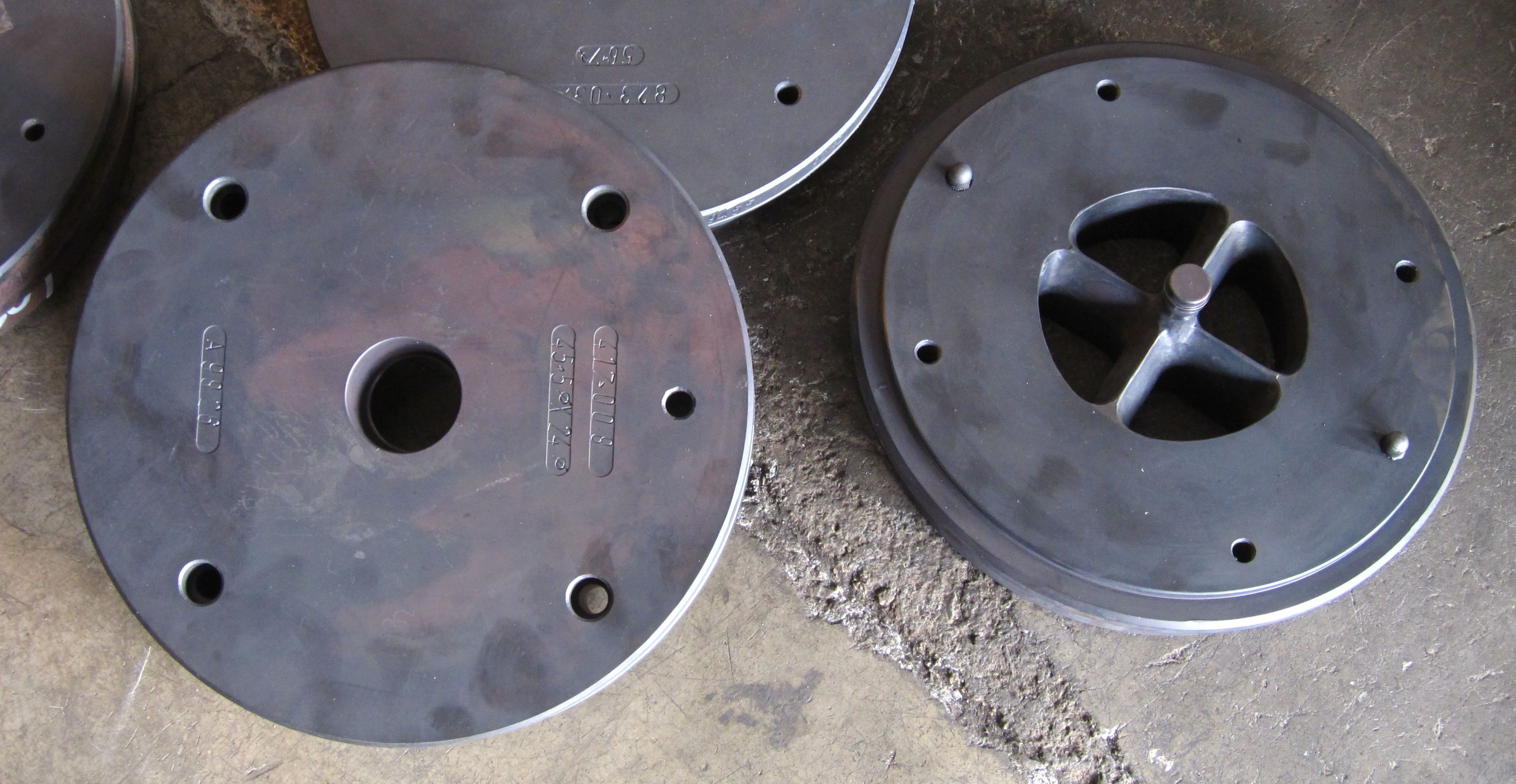
Two-piece aluminum extrusion die set (parts shown separated.) The male part (at right) is for forming the internal cavity in the resulting round tube extrusion.

There are several methods for forming internal hollow cavities in extrusions. One way is to use a hollow billet and then use a fixed or floating mandrel. A fixed mandrel, also known as a German type, means it is integrated into the dummy block and stem. A floating mandrel, also known as a French type, floats in slots in the dummy block and aligns itself in the die when extruding. If a solid billet is used as the feed material, then it must first be pierced by the mandrel before extruding through the die. A special press is used in order to control the mandrel independently from the ram. The solid billet could also be used with a spider die; porthole die or bridge die. All of these types of dies incorporate the mandrel in the die and have "legs" that hold the mandrel in place. During extrusion the metal divides, flows around the legs, then merges, leaving weld lines in the final product.

=== Direct extrusion ===
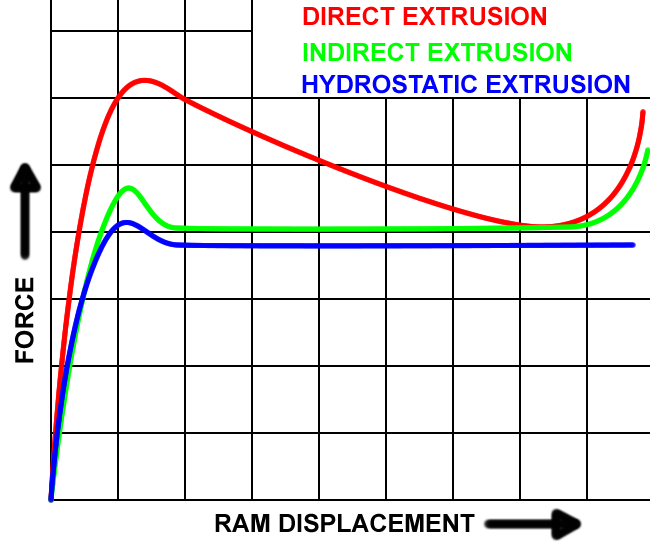
Plot of forces required by various extrusion processes

Direct extrusion, also known as forward extrusion, is the most common extrusion process. It works by placing the billet in a heavy walled container. The billet is pushed through the die by a ram or screw. There is a reusable dummy block between the ram and the billet to keep them separated. The major disadvantage of this process is that the force required to extrude the billet is greater than that needed in the indirect extrusion process because of the frictional forces introduced by the need for the billet to travel the entire length of the container. Because of this the greatest force required is at the beginning of process and slowly decreases as the billet is used up. At the end of the billet the force greatly increases because the billet is thin and the material must flow radially to exit the die. The end of the billet (called the butt end) is not used for this reason.

=== Indirect extrusion ===
In indirect extrusion, also known as backwards extrusion, the billet and container move together while the die is stationary. The die is held in place by a "stem" which has to be longer than the container length. The maximum length of the extrusion is ultimately dictated by the column strength of the stem. Because the billet moves with the container the frictional forces are eliminated. This leads to the following advantages:

- A 25 to 30% reduction of friction, which allows for extruding larger billets, increasing speed, and an increased ability to extrude smaller cross-sections
- There is less of a tendency for extrusions to crack because there is no heat formed from friction
- The container liner will last longer due to less wear
- The billet is used more uniformly so extrusion defects and coarse grained peripherals zones are less likely.

The disadvantages are:

- Impurities and defects on the surface of the billet affect the surface of the extrusion. These defects ruin the piece if it needs to be anodized or the aesthetics are important. In order to get around this the billets may be wire brushed, machined or chemically cleaned before being used.
- This process is not as versatile as direct extrusions because the cross-sectional area is limited by the maximum size of the stem.

=== Hydrostatic extrusion ===
In the hydrostatic extrusion process the billet is completely surrounded by a pressurized liquid, except where the billet contacts the die. This process can be done hot, warm, or cold, however the temperature is limited by the stability of the fluid used. The process must be carried out in a sealed cylinder to contain the hydrostatic medium. The fluid can be pressurized two ways:

- Constant-rate extrusion: A ram or plunger is used to pressurize the fluid inside the container.
- Constant-pressure extrusion: A pump is used, possibly with a pressure intensifier, to pressurize the fluid, which is then pumped to the container.

The advantages of this process include:

- No friction between the container and the billet reduces force requirements. This ultimately allows for faster speeds, higher reduction ratios, and lower billet temperatures.
- Usually the ductility of the material increases when high pressures are applied
- An even flow of material
- Large billets and large cross-sections can be extruded
- No billet residue is left on the container walls

The disadvantages are:

- The billets must be prepared by tapering one end to match the die entry angle. This is needed to form a seal at the beginning of the cycle. Usually the entire billet needs to be machined to remove any surface defects.
- Containing the fluid under high pressures can be difficult.
- A billet remnant or a plug of a tougher material must be left at the end of the extrusion to prevent a sudden release of the extrusion fluid.

=== Drives ===
Most modern direct or indirect extrusion presses are hydraulically driven, but there are some small mechanical presses still used. Of the hydraulic presses there are two types: direct-drive oil presses and accumulator water drives.

Direct-drive oil presses are the most common because they are reliable and robust. They can deliver over 35 MPa (5,000 psi). They supply a constant pressure throughout the whole billet. The disadvantage is that they are slow, between 50 and 200 mm/s (2–8 ips).

Accumulator water drives are more expensive and larger than direct-drive oil presses, and they lose about 10% of their pressure over the stroke, but they are much faster, up to 380 mm/s (15 ips). Because of this they are used when extruding steel. They are also used on materials that must be heated to very hot temperatures for safety reasons.

Hydrostatic extrusion presses usually use castor oil at pressure up to 1,400 MPa (200 ksi). Castor oil is used because it has good lubricity and high pressure properties.

=== Die design ===
The design of an extrusion profile has a large impact on how readily it can be extruded. The maximum size for an extrusion is determined by finding the smallest circle that will fit around the cross-section, this is called the circumscribing circle. This diameter, in turn, controls the size of the die required, which ultimately determines if the part will fit in a given press. For example, a larger press can handle 60 cm (24 in) diameter circumscribing circles for aluminum and 55 cm (22 in) diameter circles for steel and titanium.

The complexity of an extruded profile can be roughly quantified by calculating the shape factor, which is the amount of surface area generated per unit mass of extrusion. This affects the cost of tooling as well as the rate of production.

Thicker sections generally need an increased section size. In order for the material to flow properly legs should not be more than ten times longer than their thickness. If the cross-section is asymmetrical, adjacent sections should be as close to the same size as possible. Sharp corners should be avoided; for aluminum and magnesium the minimum radius should be 0.4 mm (1/64 in) and for steel corners should be 0.75 mm (0.030 in) and fillets should be 3 mm (0.12 in). The following table lists the minimum cross-section and thickness for various materials.

Material	Minimum cross-section [cm² (sq. in.)]	Minimum thickness [mm (in.)]
Carbon steels	2.5 (0.40)	3.00 (0.120)
Stainless steel	3.0–4.5 (0.45–0.70)	3.00–4.75 (0.120–0.187)
Titanium	3.0 (0.50)	3.80 (0.150)
Aluminium	< 2.5 (0.40)	0.70 (0.028)
Magnesium	< 2.5 (0.40)	1.00 (0.040)

There are guidelines for design for manufacturing, designs that can be manufactured easily and cheaply. These guidelines are a set of rules for a person designing a product to ease the manufacturing process, reduce cost and time. For example, if a hole is to be drilled, if the designer specifies a standard hole size, then it reduces the cost because the drill bits of unusual sizes are not readily available, they have to be custom made.

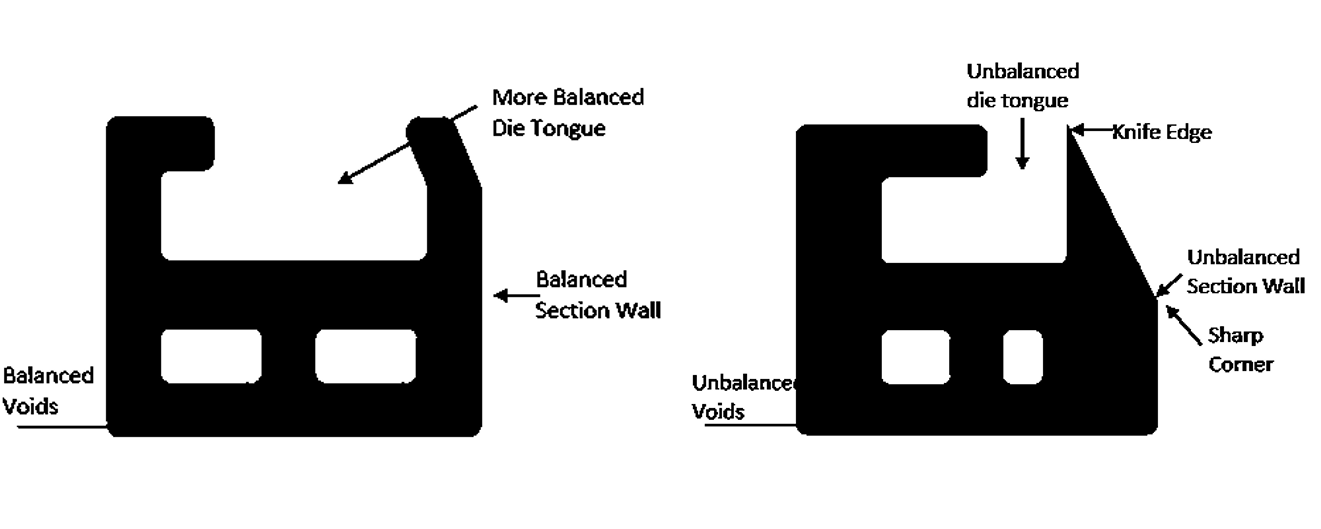
Good And Bad Practices while designing the cross section in Extrusion Process

Other design considerations for die design include minimizing hollow shapes, as they require multiple dies, thus increase production complexity and cost. The designed parts are easier to extruded if they are symmetrical, because the pressure applied on the die is balanced and reduces risks of damaging it and leaving manufacturing marks on the extruded parts.

Grooves and ribbing increase the structural integrity of the extruded profiles for more consistent results. They reduce common visual imperfections on parts. Imperfections parts may be affected by are warping, twisting and streaking. With grooves and ribbing, more material is created to emulate a thicker material, thus reducing the chances of deformations and facilitating the straightening process itself. Decorative details on surfaces such as waves or triangulation through the length of the extrusion reduce the visibility of streaks, reducing the amount of work in fine-tuning dies post-design while testing extrusions.

== Materials ==
=== Metal ===
Metals that are commonly extruded include:

- Aluminum is the most commonly extruded material. Aluminum can be hot or cold extruded. If it is hot extruded it is heated to 575 to 1100 °F (300 to 600 °C). Examples of products include profiles for tracks, frames, rails, mullions, and heat sinks.
- Brass is used to extrude corrosion free rods, automobile parts, pipe fittings, engineering parts.
- Copper (1100 to 1825 °F (600 to 1000 °C)) pipe, wire, rods, bars, tubes, and welding electrodes. Often more than 100 ksi (690 MPa) is required to extrude copper.
- Lead and tin (maximum 575 °F (300 °C)) pipes, wire, tubes, and cable sheathing. Molten lead may also be used in place of billets on vertical extrusion presses.
- Magnesium (575 to 1100 °F (300 to 600 °C)) aircraft parts and nuclear industry parts. Magnesium is about as extrudable as aluminum.
- Zinc (400 to 650 °F (200 to 350 °C)) rods, bar, tubes, hardware components, fitting, and handrails.
- Steel (1825 to 2375 °F (1000 to 1300 °C)) rods and tracks. Usually plain carbon steel is extruded, but alloy steel and stainless steel can also be extruded.
- Titanium (1100 to 1825 °F (600 to 1000 °C)) aircraft components including seat tracks, engine rings, and other structural parts.

Magnesium and aluminum alloys usually have a 0.75 μm (30 μin) RMS or better surface finish. Titanium and steel can achieve a 3 micrometres (120 μin) RMS.

In 1950, Ugine Séjournet, of France, invented a process which uses glass as a lubricant for extruding steel. The Ugine-Sejournet, or Sejournet, process is now used for other materials that have melting temperatures higher than steel or that require a narrow range of temperatures to extrude, such as the platinum-iridium alloy used to make kilogram mass standards. The process starts by heating the materials to the extruding temperature and then rolling it in glass powder. The glass melts and forms a thin film, 20 to 30 mils (0.5 to 0.75 mm), in order to separate it from chamber walls and allow it to act as a lubricant. A thick solid glass ring that is 0.25 to 0.75 in (6 to 18 mm) thick is placed in the chamber on the die to lubricate the extrusion as it is forced through the die. A second advantage of this glass ring is its ability to insulate the heat of the billet from the die. The extrusion will have a 1 mil thick layer of glass, which can be easily removed once it cools.

Another breakthrough in lubrication is the use of phosphate coatings. With this process, in conjunction with glass lubrication, steel can be cold extruded. The phosphate coat absorbs the liquid glass to offer even better lubricating properties.

=== Plastic ===
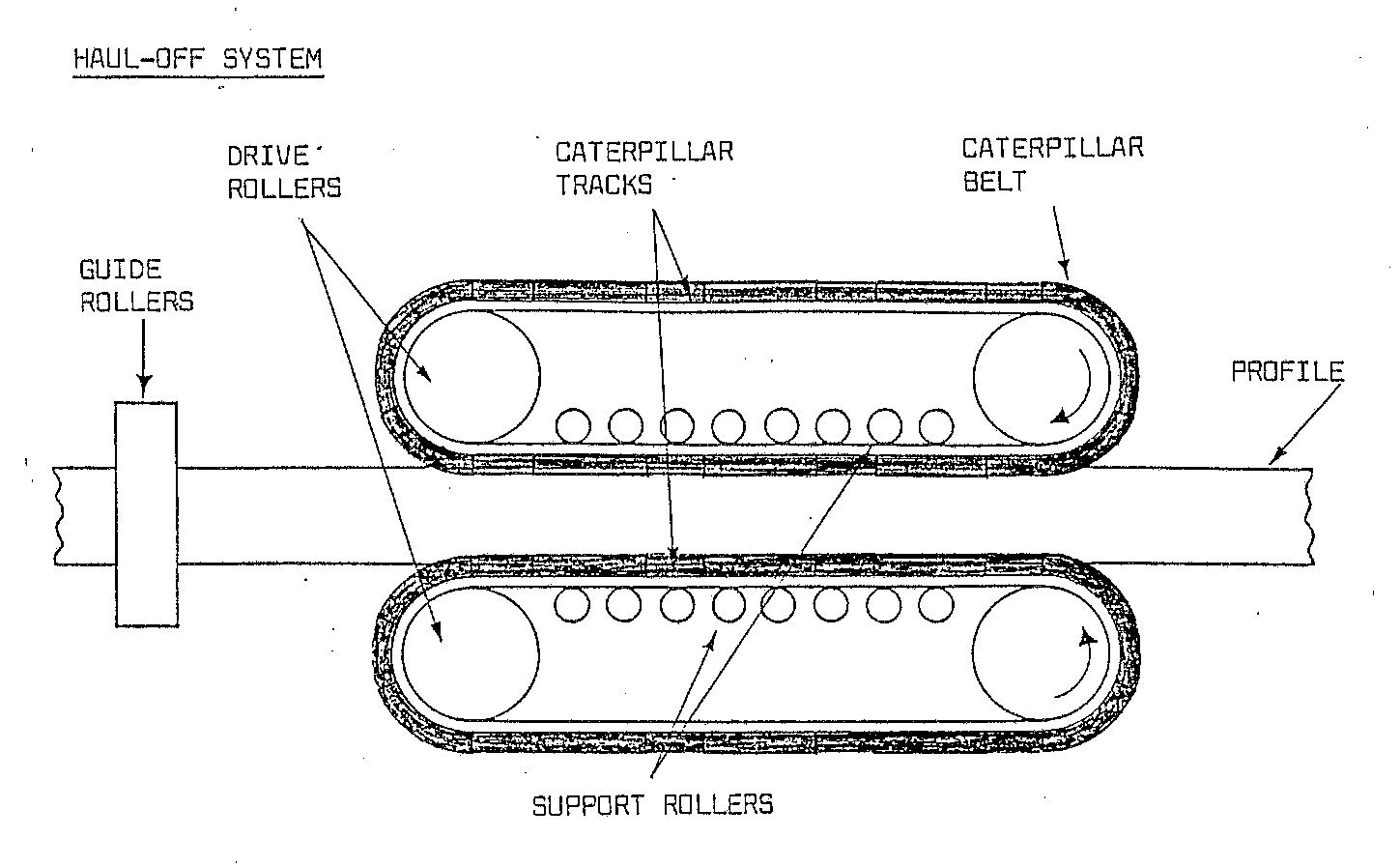
Sectional view of how a caterpillar haul-off provides line tension

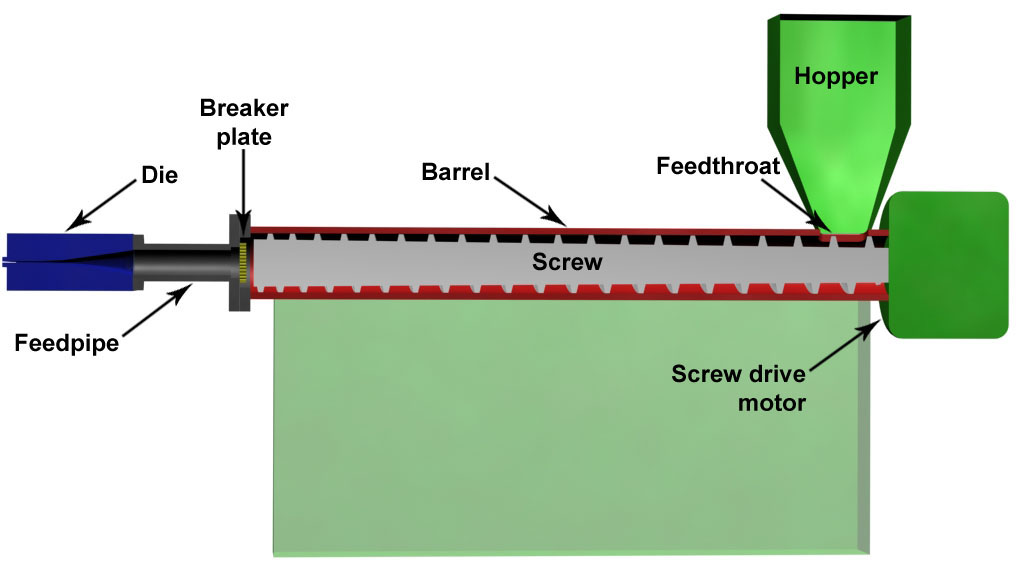
Sectional view of a plastic extruder showing the components

Plastics extrusion commonly uses plastic chips or pellets, which are usually dried, to drive out moisture, in a hopper before going to the feed screw. The polymer resin is heated to molten state by a combination of heating elements and shear heating from the extrusion screw. The screw, or screws as the case with twin screw extrusion, forces the resin through a die, forming the resin into the desired shape. The extrudate is cooled and solidified as it is pulled through the die or water tank. A "caterpillar haul-off" (called a "puller" in the US) is used to provide tension on the extrusion line which is essential for overall quality of the extrudate. Pelletizers can also create this tension while pulling extruded strands in to be cut. The caterpillar haul-off must provide a consistent pull; otherwise, variation in cut lengths or distorted product will result. In some cases (such as fibre-reinforced tubes) the extrudate is pulled through a very long die, in a process called "pultrusion". The configuration of the interior screws are a driving force dependent on the application. Mixing elements or convey elements are used in various formations. Extrusion is common in the application of adding colorant to molten plastic thus creating specific custom color.

There are multiple different types of plastic extrusions, all with their specific advantages. Co-extrusion allows the manufacturing of multi-layered parts with enhanced properties like greater chemical or UV resistance. Foam extrusion creates a light foam structure by injecting gas in the molten extrusion material. Underwater pelletization allow the melting of plastics to make pellets, which are ideal for certain plastic molding applications.

Extrusion is also a process used in fused filament deposition 3D printers, whereby the extruder is often composed of a geared motor pushing plastic filament through a nozzle.

Plastic extrusion applications include: pipes, frames, storage containers, decorative trims, cable conduits, and vehicle components.

=== Rubber ===
Rubber extrusion is a method used to make rubber items. In this process, either synthetic or natural rubber that hasn't been hardened yet is put through a machine called an extruder. This machine has a desired shaped mold and a pressurized conveyor system. The rubber gets heated and softened in the extruder, making it bendable. It then gets pushed through the mold, which gives it its final shape.

The extruder consists of two main parts: a screw that moves the rubber along the conveyor while adding other materials, and a mold where the soft rubber is squeezed into. After the rubber gets its shape from the mold, it is then vulcanized to harden it into a usable product.

This method is effective for large rubber pieces that are long and have a consistent shape, and the dies used in this process are inexpensive. It is often used to make things like rubber seals or hoses. Polymers are used in the production of plastic tubing, pipes, rods, rails, seals, and sheets or films.

=== Ceramic ===
Ceramic can also be formed into shapes via extrusion. Terracotta extrusion is used to produce pipes and tubes. Many modern bricks are also manufactured using a brick extrusion process, as well as roof or wall tiles. After the extrusion process, the extrusions are baked in a kiln, followed by glazing, coloring and applying protective coatings.

== Applications ==
=== Food ===
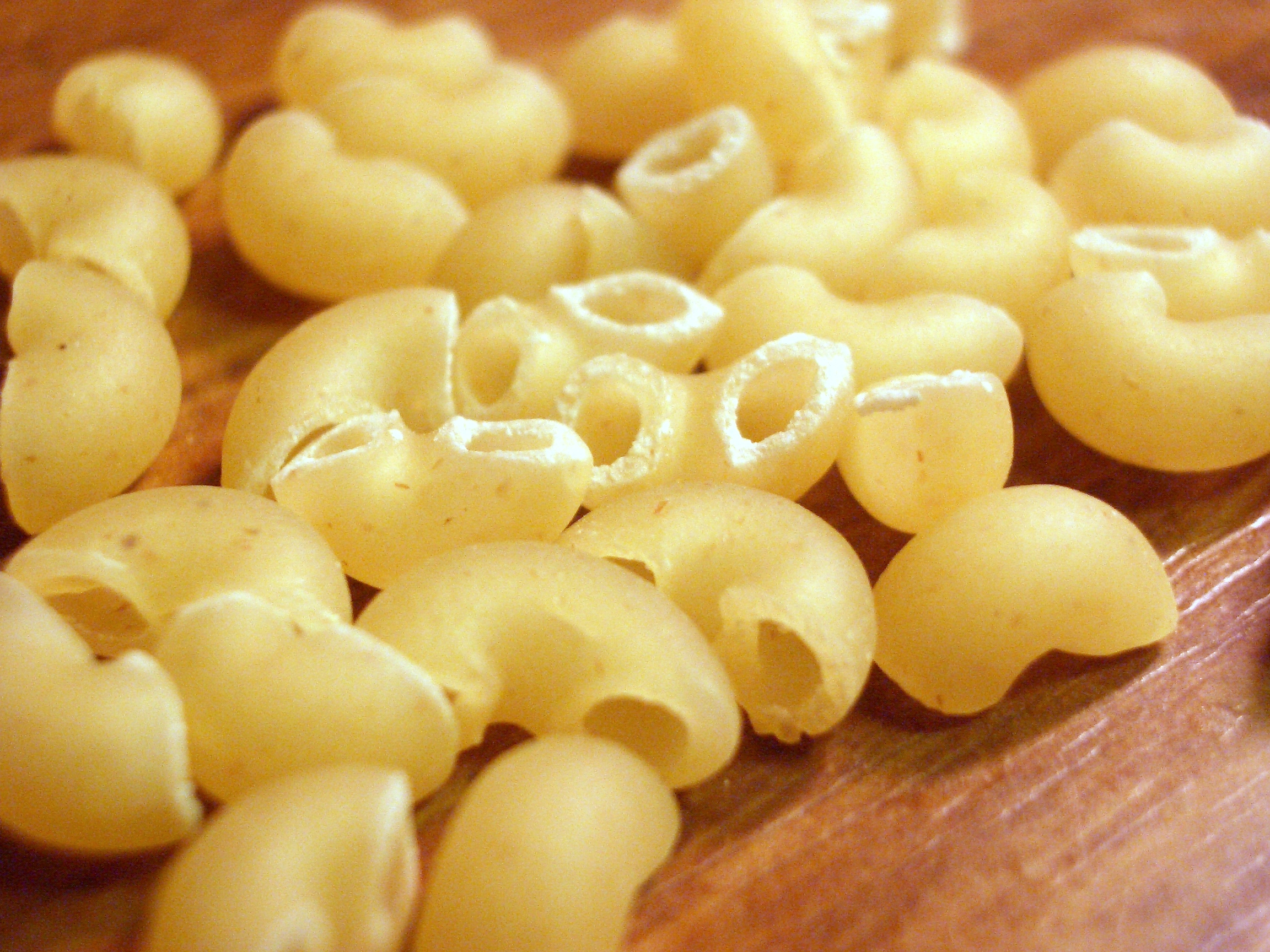
Elbow macaroni is an extruded hollow pasta.

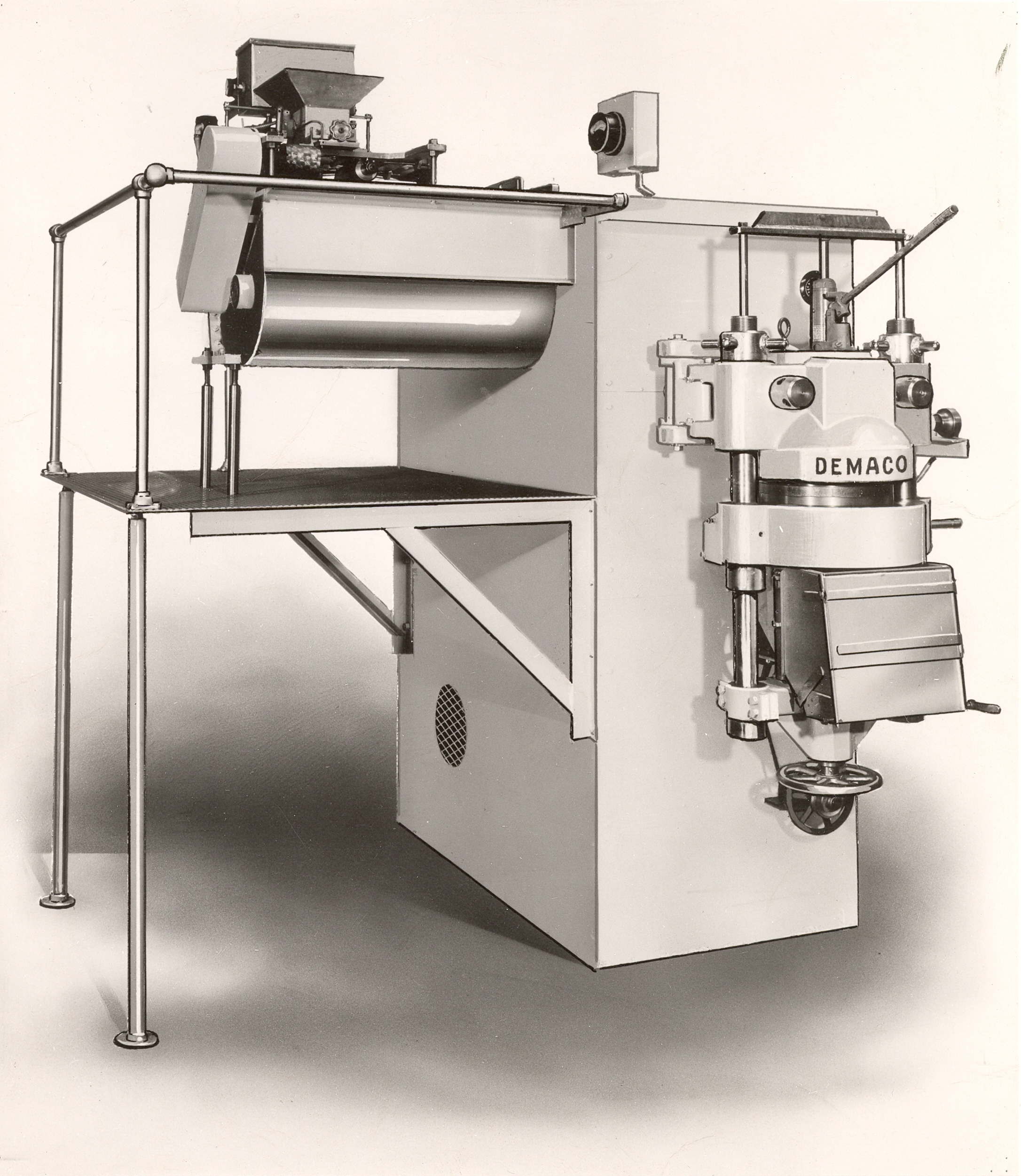
Early model pasta extruder with ingredient proportioning, dough mixing, kneading auger, die holding and product cutting in one machine

With the advent of industrial manufacturing, extrusion found application in food processing of instant foods and snacks, along with its already known uses in plastics and metal fabrication. The main role of extrusion was originally developed for conveying and shaping fluid forms of processed raw materials. Present day, extrusion cooking technologies and capabilities have developed into sophisticated processing functions including mixing, conveying, shearing, separation, heating, cooling, shaping, co-extrusion, venting volatiles and moisture, encapsulation, flavor generation and sterilization. Products such as certain pastas, many breakfast cereals, premade cookie dough, some French fries, certain baby foods, dry or semi-moist pet food and ready-to-eat snacks are mostly manufactured by extrusion. It is also used to produce modified starch, and to pelletize animal feed.

Generally, high-temperature extrusion is used for the manufacture of ready-to-eat snacks, while cold extrusion is used for the manufacture of pasta and related products intended for later cooking and consumption. The processed products have low moisture and hence considerably higher shelf life, and provide variety and convenience to consumers.

In the extrusion process, raw materials are first ground to the correct particle size. The dry mix is passed through a pre-conditioner, in which other ingredients may be added, and steam is injected to start the cooking process. The preconditioned mix is then passed through an extruder, where it is forced through a die and cut to the desired length. The cooking process takes place within the extruder where the product produces its own friction and heat due to the pressure generated (10–20 bar). The main independent parameters during extrusion cooking are feed rate, particle size of the raw material, barrel temperature, screw speed and moisture content. The extruding process can induce both protein denaturation and starch gelatinization, depending on inputs and parameters. Sometimes, a catalyst is used, for example, when producing texturized vegetable proteins (TVP).

=== Drug carriers ===
For use in pharmaceutical products, extrusion through nano-porous, polymeric filters is being used to produce suspensions of lipid vesicles liposomes or transfersomes with a particular size of a narrow size distribution. The anti-cancer drug Doxorubicin in liposome delivery system is formulated by extrusion, for example. Hot melt extrusion is also utilized in pharmaceutical solid oral dose processing to enable delivery of drugs with poor solubility and bioavailability. Hot melt extrusion has been shown to molecularly disperse poorly soluble drugs in a polymer carrier increasing dissolution rates and bioavailability. The process involves the application of heat, pressure and agitation to mix materials together and ‘extrude’ them through a die. Twin-screw high shear extruders blend materials and simultaneously break up particles. The resulting particle can be blended with compression aids and compressed into tablets or filled into unit dose capsules.

=== Biomass briquettes ===
The extrusion production technology of fuel briquettes is the process of extrusion screw wastes (straw, sunflower husks, buckwheat, etc.) or finely shredded wood waste (sawdust) under high pressure when heated from 160 to 350 °C. The resulting fuel briquettes do not include any of the binders, but one natural – the lignin contained in the cells of plant wastes. The temperature during compression causes melting of the surface of bricks, making it more solid, which is important for the transportation of briquettes.

=== Textiles ===
The majority of synthetic materials in textiles are manufactured with extrusion only. Fiber forming substances are used in extrusion to form various synthetic filaments. The molten materials are passed through a spinneret that helps in forming fibers.

== See also ==
- Curtain coating
- Equal channel angular extrusion
- Extrusion coating
- Film blowing machine
- Forming (metalworking)
- HDPE pipe
- Heated hose
- Impact extrusion
