= Plunge =

Plunge may refer to:

- Plunge (American football), a play in American football
- Plunge (geology), the inclination of a surface or axis of a fold to the horizontal
- The Plunge, a historic swim center in Richmond, California
- Plunge Creek, a river in Alaska
- Plungė, a city in Lithuania
- Plunge, the former name for the American rock band Cinder Road
- Plunge, a type of waterfall
- Plunge (gambling), sudden support for a horse in a race
- A swim center in Belmont Park (San Diego), California
- Plunge for distance, a former diving event
- Plunge (Fever Ray album), 2017
- Plunge (Sam Evian album), 2024

== See also ==
- Plunger, a common device used to release stoppages in plumbing
- Plunger (disambiguation)
