= Variable displacement pump =

Device that converts mechanical energy to hydraulic energy

A variable displacement pump is a device that converts mechanical energy to hydraulic (fluid) energy. The displacement, or amount of fluid pumped per revolution of the pump's input shaft can be varied while the pump is running.

Many variable displacement pumps are "reversible", meaning that they can act as a hydraulic motor and convert fluid energy into mechanical energy.

== Types ==
A common type of variable-displacement pump used in vehicle technology is the axial piston pump. This pump has several pistons in cylinders arranged parallel to each other and rotating around a central shaft. A swashplate at one end is connected to the pistons. As the pistons rotate, the angle of the plate causes them to move in and out of their cylinders. A rotary valve at the opposite end from the swashplate alternately connects each cylinder to the fluid supply and delivery lines. By changing the angle of the swashplate, the stroke of the pistons can be varied continuously. If the swashplate is perpendicular to the axis of rotation, no fluid will flow. If it is at a sharp angle, a large volume of fluid will be pumped. Some pumps allow the swashplate to be moved in both directions from the zero position, pumping fluid in either direction without reversing the rotation of the pump.

An efficient variation is the bent axis pump. Bending the axis reduces side loads on the pistons.

Piston pumps can be made variable-displacement by inserting springs inline with the pistons. The displacement is not positively controlled, but decreases as back-pressure increases.

Another variation is the variable-displacement vane pump, a type that has found usage in motor vehicle automatic transmissions, such as the General Motors Hydra-Matic.
