= Hydraulic Press Channel =

YouTube channel

YouTube information
- Channel: HydraulicPressChannel
- Years active: 2015–present
- Genre: Science
- Subscribers: 10.3 million
- Views: 6.59 billion
- Last updated: April 23, 2026

Hydraulic Press Channel (HPC) is a YouTube channel operated by Finnish workshop owner Lauri Vuohensilta. Launched in October 2015, the channel publishes videos of various objects being crushed in a hydraulic press, as well as occasional experiments using different devices. On 31 October 2015, the channel published a video of Vuohensilta unsuccessfully attempting to fold a piece of paper more than seven times with the hydraulic press. The video was subsequently posted to the social news website Reddit in March 2016, causing it to receive more than two million views within a day.

The channel's unexpected success caused Vuohensilta to continue producing videos for the Hydraulic Press Channel. In June 2016, the channel became eligible for both the silver and the gold YouTube Play Buttons, leading to his attempt to crush the silver one with the press. Analysis of the channel's success often cites the excitement of the unexpected results, Vuohensilta's sense of humor, and his distinctive Finnish accent.

== Overview ==
Each video begins with an intro, in which Vuohensilta announces, "Welcome to the Hydraulic Press Channel". He then introduces one or more objects that he is going to crush using the hydraulic press.

Objects that have been crushed using the press include a golf ball, a book, a rubber duck, a bearing ball, a bowling ball and pin, a hockey puck, Lego toys, a Nokia 3310, a Barbie doll, a diamond, and multiple smaller hydraulic presses. Videos may also feature the press crushing an assortment of items, such as explosive materials, objects that have been placed in liquid nitrogen, fruits, and Australian memorabilia.

Originally at the end of each video, after the outro, a clay figure made by his then wife, Anni Vuohensilta, often described by Lauri as "very dangerous", was "dealt with" by the press as "extra content" of the day.

=== Hydraulic press specifications ===
It is noted in the "how to use hydraulic press" video that the press weighs 4 tonnes (8,800 lb).

The press can exert 144 tonnes (142 long tons; 159 short tons) of force. The main pump maxes out at 100 tonnes of force then an additional smaller pump finishes the total force.

Vuohensilta noted that the green colour was painted by him and that the press was not always green.

Since 2023, a new press capable of exerting 300 tonnes of force has been used in partnership with Dutch manufacturer Profi Press.

In addition to this, Vuohensilta has constructed a bulletproof concrete bunker for the press to be enclosed in, allowing for more dangerous experiments to be performed.

== History ==
The channel officially launched on 6 October 2015. Living in Tampere, Finland, Vuohensilta was inspired to create the Hydraulic Press Channel after discovering other YouTube channels committed to destroying objects, especially a channel called carsandwater, popular for videos of a man using a red-hot ball of nickel to melt various objects. Although Vuohensilta originally promised a new video every week, the channel became dormant after uploading a video on 31 October 2015 of him attempting unsuccessfully to fold a piece of paper more than seven times with the hydraulic press. The paper explosively collapsed into a brittle, stone-like material at the seventh fold. Thomas Amidon, a paper engineering professor at the State University of New York College of Environmental Science and Forestry, speculated in an interview with Popular Science that the cause of the explosion might have been the collapse of calcium carbonate within the paper, which had provided it with stiffness and opacity.

Despite its dormancy, the channel received widespread attention in March 2016 after the paper video was submitted to the social news website Reddit and subsequently received more than two million views within 24 hours. Following its unexpected popularity, the channel began publishing videos again, with new videos typically receiving over a million views within days of their release. The channel's success allowed Vuohensilta to enter a deal with a 3D printing company and receive a 3D printer. Vuohensilta planned to first use the printer to make more sophisticated safety equipment, and then to allow people to send him "... earmarks of stuff that they want to be crushed, and then I can just print them out here and crush them and make the video."

In June 2016, the channel was awarded with the silver YouTube Play Button, in commemoration for the channel reaching 100,000 subscribers. On 20 June 2016, the channel uploaded a video in which Vuohensilta attempts to crush the trophy using the press. Already in June 2016, the channel reached its millionth subscriber, making them eligible for the gold Play Button. Vuohensilta considered acquiring a more powerful press to accommodate the achievement.

The fourth most-viewed upload on the channel, with 24 million views as of June 2021, was produced in 2017 in partnership with 20th Century Fox to promote the then-upcoming film Logan, in which Vuohensilta tries to crush an "adamantium" bearing ball and then Wolverine's claws, both resulting in damage or destruction of the "hardened" pressing tool.

Anni Vuohensilta took leave of the channel in 2021 due to burnout and mental health issues, as well as having lost interest. In December 2022, Lauri and Anni announced their amicable divorce.

Since 2023, Lauri has run the channel with his new partner, Hanna Korpisaari. In 2025, during their 10 million subscription stream, they announced that they had married.

== Response ==
Brad Reed, in an article published in Boy Genius Report, wrote that the "couple’s reactions are part of what make the videos so funny", highlighting Vuohensilta's wife Anni's laugh, which can frequently be heard in the background of the Hydraulic Press Channel's videos, as well as Vuohensilta's tendency to "state the obvious in a fairly deadpan manner". Vuohensilta has a distinctive Finnish accent, which he believes influenced the Hydraulic Press Channel's success. Jesse Singal, in an article published on New York magazine's website, wrote that the channel attracts viewers by combining the "tension" created by the hydraulic press's destructive power with Vuohensilta's "goofy nerdiness".

Vuohensilta also attributes the channel's attractiveness to the excitement of the explosions and the unexpected results, as well as "the humor value of everything, my accent and stupid jokes". In 2017, the channel received a Shorty Award in the "weird" category. They got two pieces of the award, of which they crushed the other one.

== Beyond the Press channel ==
In April 2016, the Vuohensilta couple opened a secondary YouTube channel called Beyond the Press, featuring behind-the-scenes material from the Hydraulic Press Channel. The video content includes, for example, the usual work in the workshop, experimental videos as well as various creative ways to explode or destroy stuff beyond the hydraulic press. As of April 2024, the channel has over 700,000 subscribers.
