= Hydraulic transmission =

Hydraulic transmission may refer to various transmission methods for transferring engine power to drive wheels, using hydraulic fluid:

- Diesel-hydraulic transmission, used in railway locomotives
- Hydrostatic transmission, using hydraulic motors to convert the fluid energy into rotary propulsion
- Hydraulic drive system § Hydraulic cylinder, using hydraulic rams acting on a swashplate or crank to convert the fluid pressure into rotation
- Hydrokinetic transmission, involving one or more torque converters; commonly used in railway locomotives
- Hydraulic automatic transmissions in automobiles manufactured in the mid-20th century, with trade names such as "Hydromatic"

== See also ==
- Hydraulic machinery, machinery powered by hydraulic motors/hydraulic transmission
- Hydraulic (disambiguation)
