= Hydraulic resistance =

Hydraulic resistance may refer to:

- hydraulic resistance training, a form of strength training
- hydraulic conductivity
