= Radial piston pump =

A radial piston pump is a form of hydraulic pump. The working pistons extend in a radial direction symmetrically around the drive shaft, in contrast to the axial piston pump.

== Construction ==
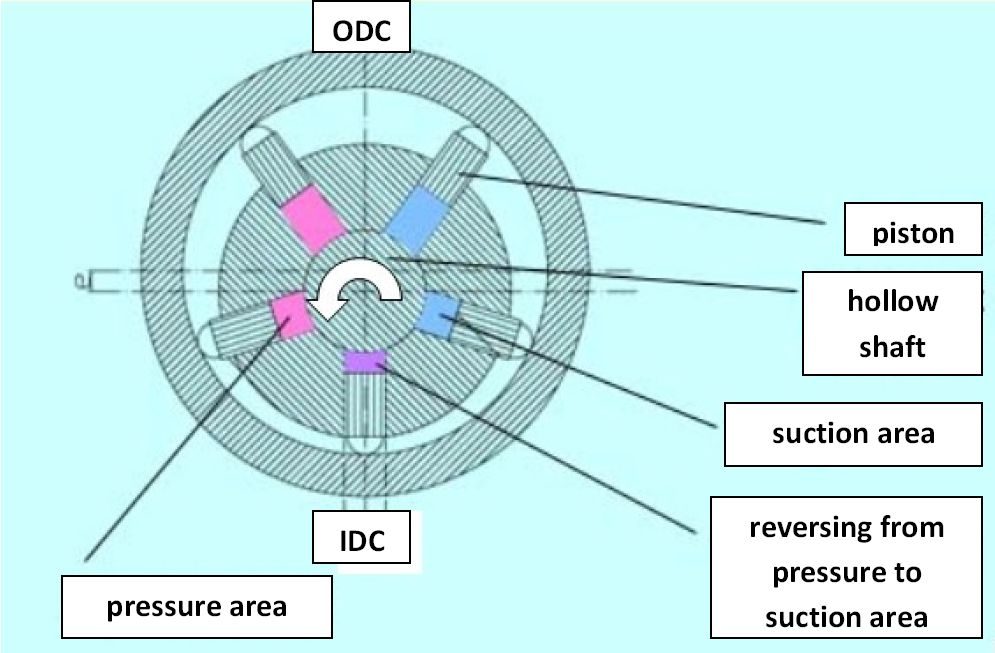
Picture 1: inside impinged radial piston pump

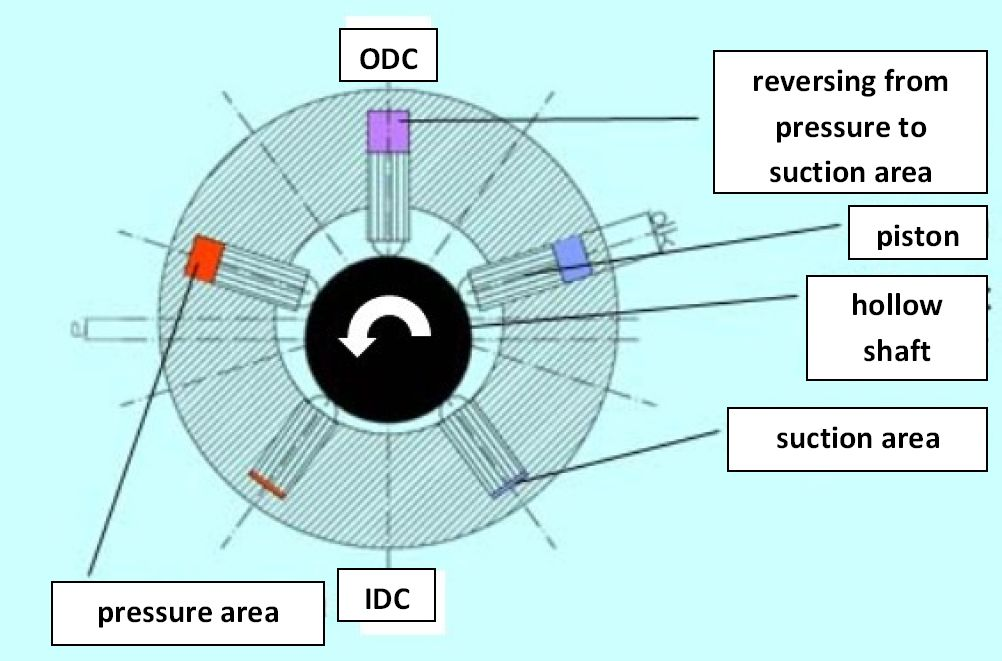
Picture 2: outside impinged radial piston pump

The stroke of each piston is caused by an eccentric drive shaft or an external eccentric tappet (e.g., stroke ring).

When filling the workspace of the pumping pistons from "inside" (e.g., over a hollow shaft) it is called an inside impinged (but outside braced) radial piston pump (picture 1). If the workspace is filled from "outside" it's called an outside impinged radial piston pump (but inside braced) (picture 2).

== Function ==
The general mode of operation will be explained at the movement of one pumping piston by means of picture 1:
The outer ring for bracing of the pumping pistons is in eccentric position to the hollow shaft in the center. This eccentricity determines the stroke of the pumping piston.

The piston starts in the inner dead center (IDC) with suction process. After a rotation angle of 180° it is finished and the workspace of the piston is filled with the moved medium. The piston is now in the outer dead center (ODC). From this point on the piston displaces the previously sucked medium in the pressure channel of the pump.

== Attributes ==
These kinds of piston pumps are characterized by the following advantages:

- high efficiency
- high pressure (up to 1,000 bar or 14000psi)
- low flow and pressure ripple (due to the small dead volume in the workspace of the pumping piston)
- low noise level
- very high load at lowest speed due to the hydrostatically balanced parts possible
- no axial internal forces at the drive shaft bearing
- high reliability

A disadvantage is the bigger radial dimensions in comparison to the axial piston pump, but it could be compensated with the shorter construction in axial direction.

== Applications ==
Due to the hydrostatically balanced parts it is possible to use the pump with various hydraulic fluids like mineral oil, biodegradable oil, HFA (oil in water), HFC (water-glycol), HFD (synthetic ester) or cutting emulsion. That implies the following main applications for a radial piston pump:

- machine tools (e.g., displace of cutting emulsion, supply for hydraulic equipment like cylinders)
- high pressure units (HPU) (e.g., for overload protection of presses)
- test rigs
- automotive sector (e.g., automatic transmission, hydraulic suspension control in upper-class cars)
- plastic- and powder injection molding
- wind energy

== See also ==
- Axial piston pump
- Hydraulics
- Pump
