= Hydraulic power =

Hydraulic power may refer to:

- Hydropower, power derived from the energy of falling or fast running water
- Fluid power, use of fluids under pressure to generate, control, and transmit power
- Power supplied via a Hydraulic power network, using pressurised water.
- Erosive work done by hydraulic action of the sea or other water source.
