= Hydraulic intensifier =

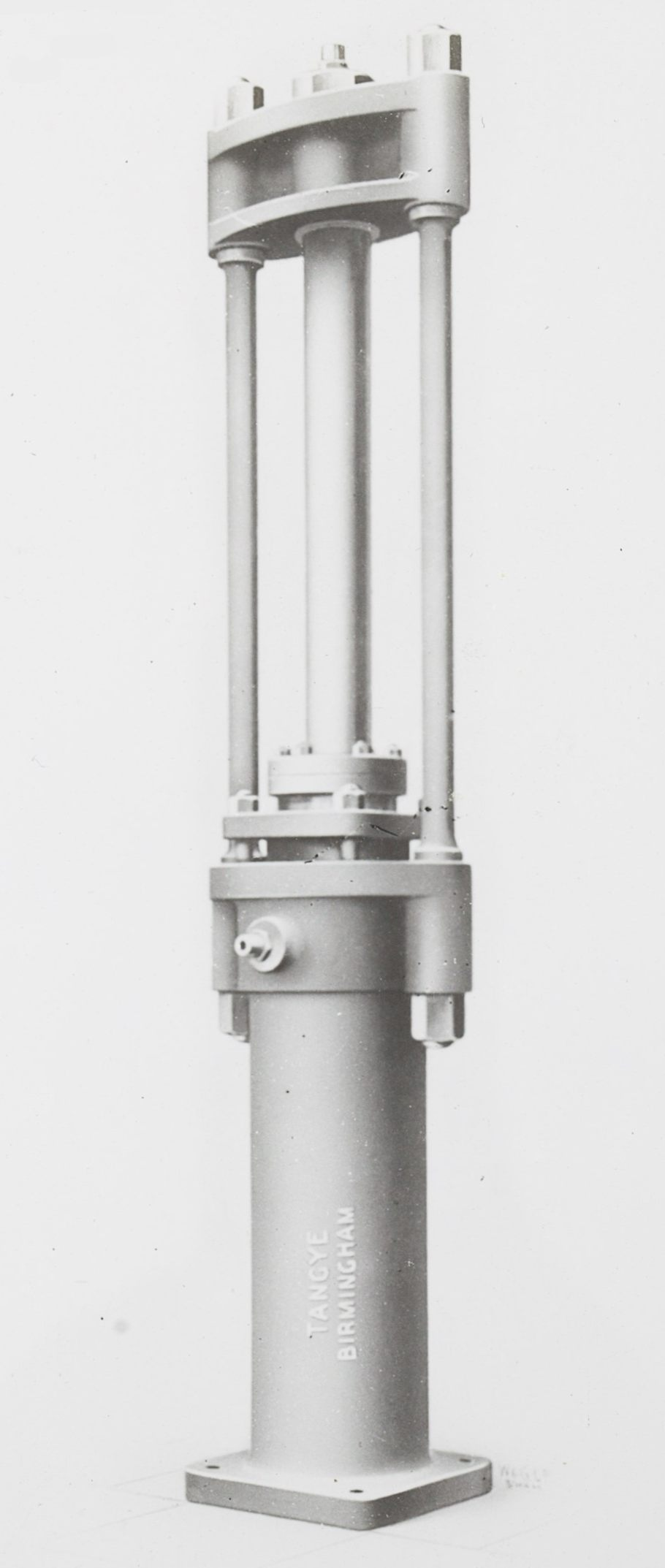
Hydraulic intensifier, by Tangye

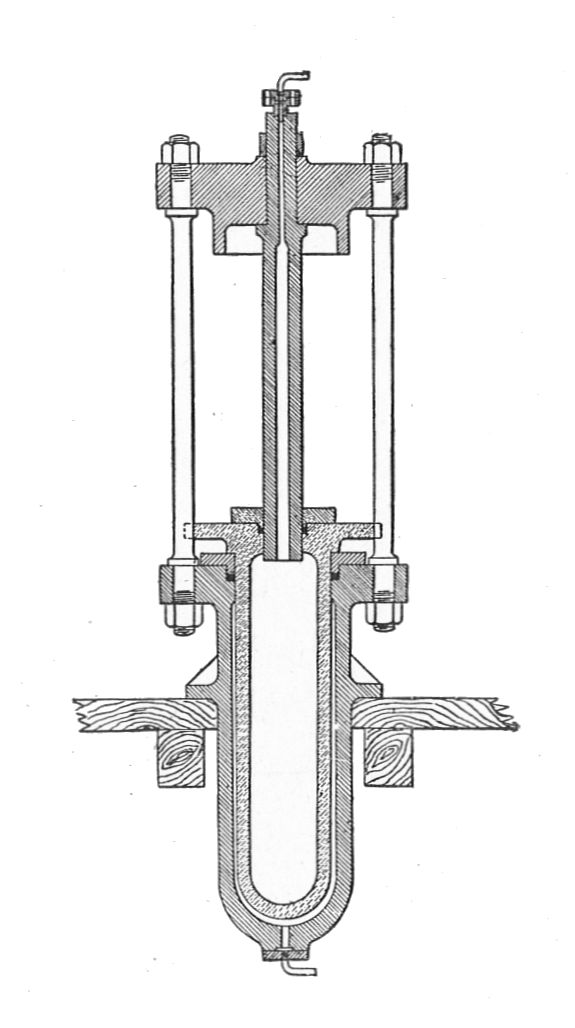
Section of a concentric cylinder hydraulic intensifier, from Kennedy, Modern Engines

A hydraulic intensifier is a hydraulic machine for transforming hydraulic power at low pressure into a reduced volume at higher pressure.

== Operation ==
Such a machine may be constructed by mechanically connecting two pistons, each working in a separate cylinder of a different diameter. As the pistons are mechanically linked, their force and stroke length are the same. If the diameters are different, the hydraulic pressure in each cylinder will vary in the same ratio as their areas: the smaller piston giving rise to a higher pressure. As the pressure is inversely proportional to the area, it will be inversely proportional to the square of the diameter.

The working volume of the intensifier is limited by the stroke of the piston. This in turn limits the amount of work that may be done by one stroke of the intensifier. These are not reciprocating machines (i.e. continually running multi-stroke machines) and so their entire work must be carried out by a single stroke. This limits their usefulness somewhat, to machines that can accomplish their task within a single stroke. They are often used where a powerful hydraulic jack is required, but there is insufficient space to fit the cylinder size that would normally be required, for the lifting force necessary and with the available system pressure. Using an intensifier, mounted outside the jack, allows a higher pressure to be obtained and thus a smaller cylinder used for the same lift force. Intensifiers are also used as part of machines such as hydraulic presses, where a higher pressure is required and a suitable supply is already available.

Some small intensifiers have been constructed with a stepped piston. This is a double-ended piston, of two different diameters, each end working in a different cylinder. This construction is simple and compact, requiring an overall length little more than twice the stroke. It is also still necessary to provide two seals, one for each piston, and to vent the area between them. A leak of pressure into the volume between the pistons would transform the machine into an effective single piston with equal area on each side, thus defeating the intensifier effect.

A mechanically compact and popular form of intensifier is the concentric cylinder form, as illustrated. In this design, one piston and cylinder are reversed: instead of the large diameter piston driving a smaller piston, it instead drives a smaller moving cylinder that fits over a fixed piston. This design is compact, and again may be made in little over twice the stroke. It has the great advantage though that there is no "piston rod" and the effective distance between the two pistons is short, thus permitting a much lighter construction without risk of bending or jamming.

In the example illustrated, the two pistons are approximately 1:2 ratio in diameter, giving a 1:4 increase in pressure. Note that it is the diameter of the effective piston, i.e. the seal diameter that matters. The cylinders here are relieved beyond the seal and are of greater diameter, for easy running. Although the moving cylinder's bore is around ¾ of the outer diameter, not ½, it is its seal diameter that matters, not its internal clearance bore.

The celebrated mechanical engineer Harry Ricardo began his career by working in his grandfather, Alexander Rendel's, civil engineering practice. At the time they were involved in the construction of bridges in India, which required hydraulic lifting, hoisting and riveting equipment. As the existing transport infrastructure was poor, all plant used on site needed to be lightweight and easily portable. Machines also needed to be connected to their hydraulic power source by flexible tubing, which limited their working pressure to around 500 psi. At this time, modern shipyard equipment was using pressures of up to 2000 psi. This high-pressure equipment was smaller and lighter than the bulkier low-pressure variety, a desirable feature for this construction work. Ricardo's innovation was to specify the use of portable hydraulic intensifiers for these tools, permitting the use of the improved high-pressure form, even where their supply was at low-pressure, through flexible hose. These intensifiers were so successful that eventually several hundred were supplied and used.

== Inline vs. parallel intensifiers ==
There are two specialized types of hydraulic intensifier used for water jet cutting. The first and most common is the inline hydraulic intensifier. Oscillating hydraulic pistons are used to compress water to the required pressure levels. The water jet system's cutting head restricts the water flow to generate pressure and direct it onto the workpiece. A holding tank, called a hydraulic accumulator, is used to reduce pressure vibrations at the output end.

The more recently developed parallel hydraulic intensifier also uses oscillating pistons to compress water. However, these systems use multiple cylinders that operate in a parallel fashion, ensuring that one cylinder is always in compression mode. This feature minimize the pressure fluctuations that are common with inline designs, and eliminates the need for an accumulator. Efficiency and reliability are also improved.
