= Plunger =

Tool to clear blockages in drains and pipes

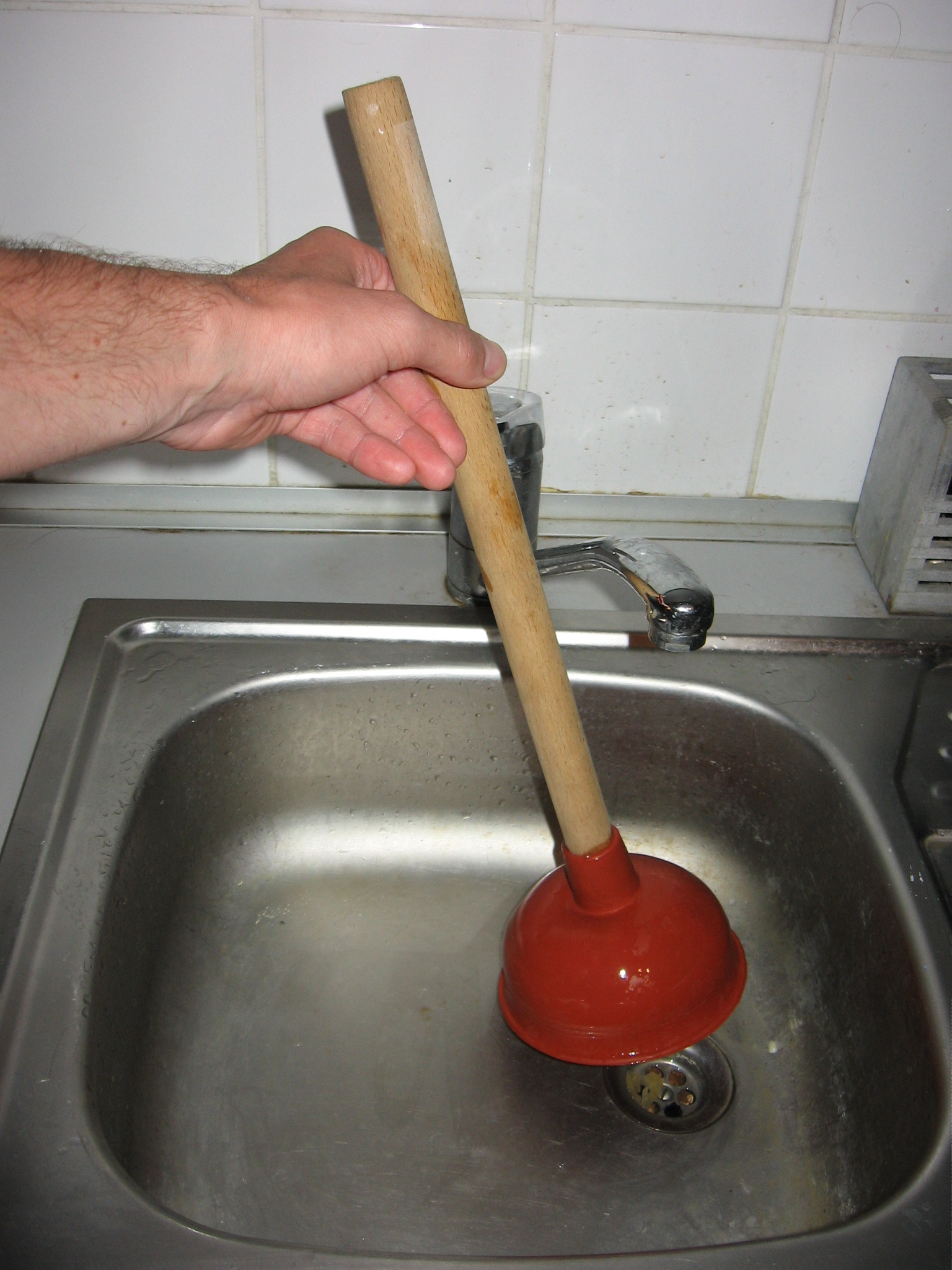
Plumbing plunger in a sink

A plunger is a tool driven by or against fluid pressure. In plumbing, the term plunger commonly refers to handheld tools used to clear blockages in drains and pipes. Plumbing plungers consist of a rubber suction cup attached to a stick (shaft) usually made of wood or plastic. A different bellows-like design is usually constructed of plastic. Alternate names for plumbing plungers include force cup, plumber's friend or plumber's helper.

In musical performance, tools called plungers are used to mute trumpets and trombones. A plunger may also refer to a component of a device that generates fluid flow, such as in a medical syringe or a French press coffee brewer.

== History ==
The plumbing plunger was invented in 1874 by New York confectioner John Hawley, with the flattened rim added in 1876. The invention is referred to in the patent as a "vent-clearer", and was marketed as a "force cup".

== Applications ==
=== Plumbing ===
==== Use ====
For the common plunger, the cup is pushed down against the drain opening, either pressing hard into the drain to force air in or pushing down until the rubber cup is flattened. The cup is then pulled out, creating a vacuum to pull blockage material upward and dislodge waste or other material.

==== Shape and function ====
The cup of a kitchen plunger looks like a rubber ball cut in half with a flared edge, while the toilet plunger's cup looks more like a distorted bowl, tapered on one half, with a large opening on the bottom.

A plunger is much more effective with water in the pipe, as water does not compress and thus transmits more of the applied force than does air. When a plunger alone is ineffective, it can be supplemented by a chemical drain cleaner for sinks and tubs; or a plumber's snake for stubborn clogs, and clogs of the main line or toilet.

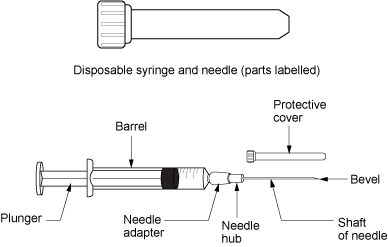
Components of a disposable syringe including its plunger

=== Syringes ===
In syringes, plungers are constrained to linear motion as they are pulled and pushed within an outer tube or "barrel." The plunger allows the syringe to take in or expel fluid through an orifice at the open end of the barrel. In disposable syringes, the plunger is often made of plastic with a rubber tip that seals between itself and the barrel.

== See also ==
- Plunger mute for brass instruments
