= Plunger pump =

Type of positive displacement pump

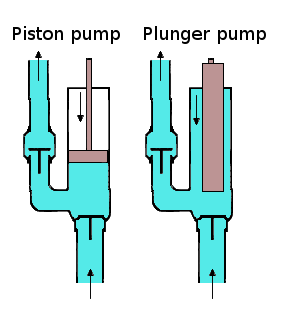
Piston pump compared to a plunger pump

A plunger pump is a type of positive displacement pump where the high-pressure seal is stationary and a smooth cylindrical plunger slides through the seal. This makes them different from piston pumps and allows them to be used at higher pressures. This type of pump is often used to transfer municipal and industrial sewage.

== History ==
The invention of the plunger pump is attributed to Samuel Morland based on a patent of 1675.

== Operation ==
Piston pumps and plunger pumps are positive displacement pumps that use a plunger or piston to move media through a cylindrical chamber. The plunger or piston is actuated by a steam powered, pneumatic, hydraulic, or electric drive.

Rotary piston and plunger pumps use a crank mechanism to create a reciprocating motion along an axis, which then builds pressure in a cylinder or working barrel to force gas or fluid through the pump. The pressure in the chamber actuates the valves at both the suction and discharge points. Plunger pumps are used in applications that could range from 70 to 2,070 bar (1,000 to 30,000 psi). Piston pumps are used in lower pressure applications. The volume of the fluid discharged is equal to the area of the plunger or piston, multiplied by its stroke length. The overall capacity of the piston pumps and plunger pumps can be calculated with the area of the piston or plunger, the stroke length, the number of pistons or plungers and the speed of the drive. The power needed from the drive is proportional to the pressure and capacity of the pump.

Seals are an integral part of piston pumps and plunger pumps to separate the power fluid from the medium that is being pumped. A stuffing box or packing is used to seal the joint between the vessel where the medium is transferred and the plunger or piston. A stuffing box may be composed of bushings, packing or seal rings, and a gland.

Plunger pumps' component materials are chosen for wear and contact with the type of medium. Component materials include bronze, brass, steel, stainless steel, iron, nickel alloy, or other material. For example, plunger pumps that function in general service or oil service applications often have an iron cylinder and plunger. The plunger, discharge valves, and suction valves come in contact with the transferred medium, and material choices are based on the fluid transferred. In power applications where continuous duty plunger pumps are needed, solid ceramic plungers may be used when in contact with water and oil, but may not be compatible for use with highly acidic media types.

== See also ==
- Piston pump
