= Hydraulic press =

Machine press using a hydraulic cylinder to generate a compressive force

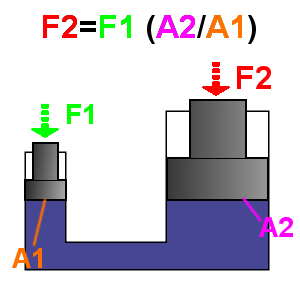
Hydraulic force increase

A hydraulic press is a machine press using a hydraulic cylinder to generate a compressive force. It uses the hydraulic equivalent of a mechanical lever, and was also known as a Bramah press after the inventor, Joseph Bramah. He invented and was issued a patent on this press in 1795. As Bramah installed toilets and developed the modern flush toilet, he studied existing literature on the motion of fluids to develop the press.

== Main principle ==
The hydraulic press depends on Pascal's principle. The pressure throughout a closed system is constant. One part of the system is a piston acting as a pump, with a modest mechanical force acting on a small cross-sectional area; the other part is a piston with a larger area which generates a correspondingly large mechanical force. Only small-diameter tubing (which more easily resists pressure) is needed if the pump is separated from the press cylinder.

== Application ==
Hydraulic presses are commonly used for assembly and disassembly of tightly-fitting components. In manufacturing, they are used for forging, clinching, molding, blanking, punching, deep drawing, and metal forming operations. Hydraulic presses are also used for stretch forming, rubber pad forming, and powder compacting. The hydraulic press is advantageous in manufacturing, as it gives the ability to create more intricate shapes than other methods and can be economical with materials. A hydraulic press will take up less space compared to a mechanical press of the same capability. Hydraulic presses are also used for waste processing operations such as in garbage trucks and car crushers to reduce the size of waste material for easier more economic transportation.

In geology a tungsten carbide coated hydraulic press is used in the rock crushing stage of preparing samples for geochemical analyses in topics such as understanding the origins of volcanism.

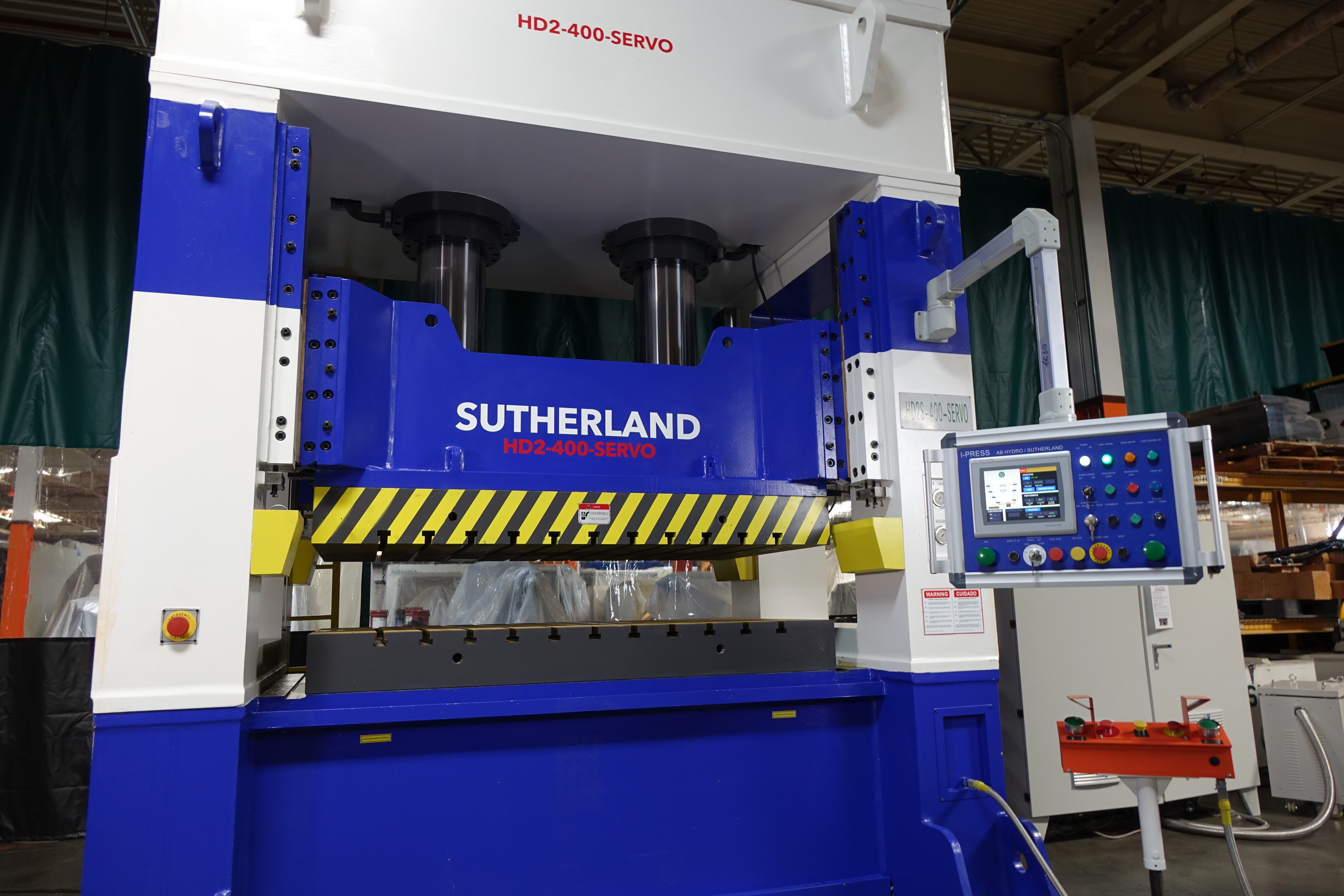
440-ton compression hydraulic molding press

== In popular culture ==
A hydraulic press is featured prominently in the Sherlock Holmes story "The Adventure of the Engineer's Thumb".

The room featured in Fermat's Room has a design similar to that of a hydraulic press. Boris Artzybasheff also created a drawing of a hydraulic press, in which the press was created out of the shape of a robot.

In 2015, the Hydraulic Press Channel, a YouTube channel dedicated to crushing objects with a hydraulic press, was created by Lauri Vuohensilta, a factory owner from Tampere, Finland. The Hydraulic Press Channel has since grown to over 10 million subscribers on YouTube. There are numerous other YouTube channels that publish videos involving hydraulic presses that are tasked with crushing many different items, such as bowling balls, soda cans, plastic toys, and metal tools.

== See also ==
- Benjamin Hick
- Universal testing machine
