= Axial piston pump =

Positive-displacement pump

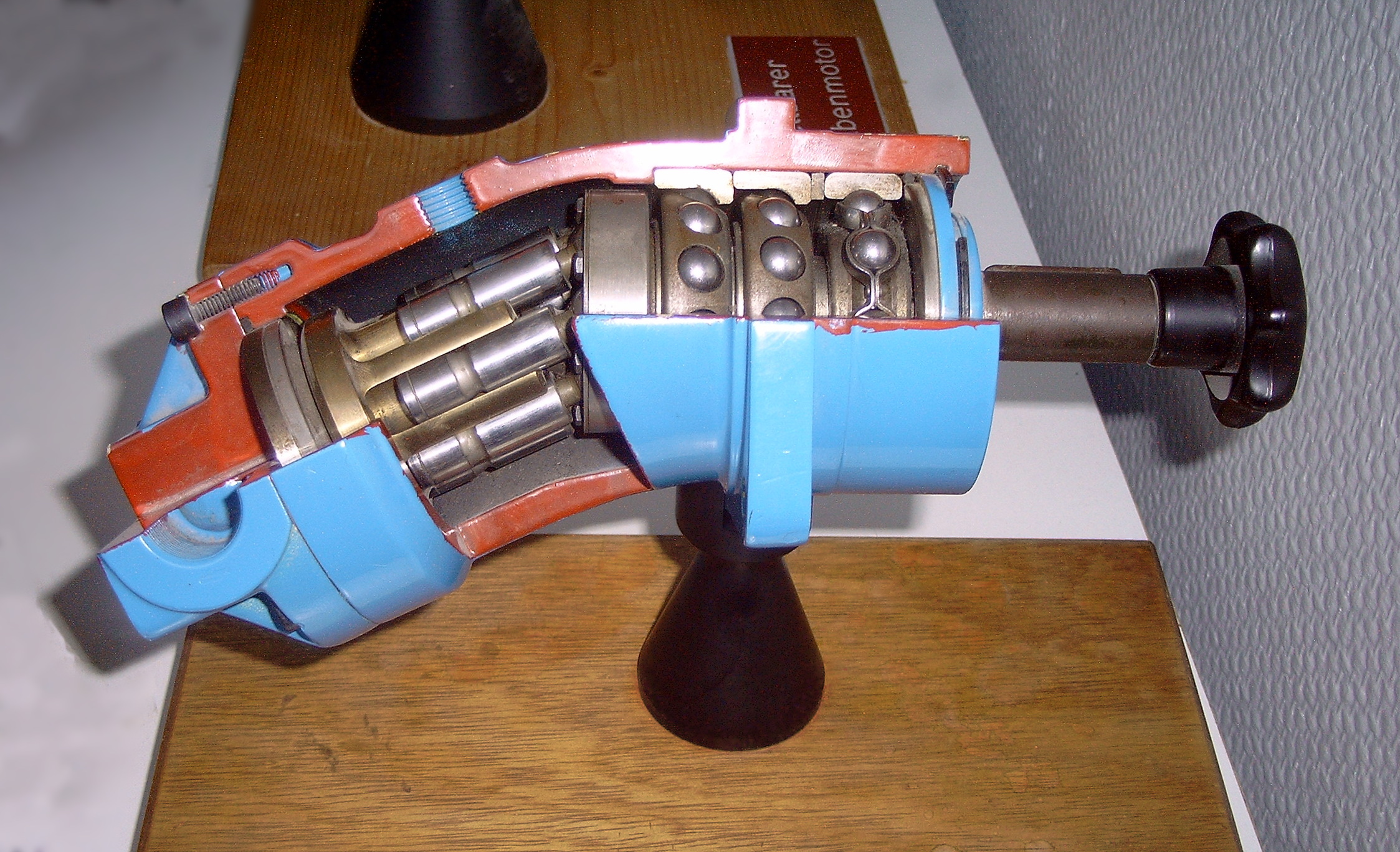
Axial piston pump

An axial piston pump is a positive displacement pump that has a number of pistons in a circular array within a cylinder block.

It can be used as a stand-alone pump, a hydraulic motor or an automotive air conditioning compressor.

== Description ==
Cutaway side-view diagram of an axial piston pump

3-D rendering of an axial piston pump with the parts labeled

Animation of an axial piston pump in operation

An axial piston pump has a number of pistons (usually an odd number) arranged in a circular array within a housing which is commonly referred to as a cylinder block, rotor or barrel. This cylinder block is driven to rotate about its axis of symmetry by an integral shaft that is, more or less, aligned with the pumping pistons (usually parallel but not necessarily).

- Mating surfaces. One end of the cylinder block is convex and wears against a mating surface on a stationary valve plate. The inlet and outlet fluid of the pump pass through different parts of the sliding interface between the cylinder block and valve plate. The valve plate has two semi-circular ports that allow inlet of the operating fluid and exhaust of the outlet fluid respectively.
- Protruding pistons. The pumping pistons protrude from the opposite end of the cylinder block. There are numerous configurations used for the exposed ends of the pistons but in all cases they bear against a cam. In variable displacement units, the cam is movable and commonly referred to as a swashplate, yoke or hanger. For conceptual purposes, the cam can be represented by a plane, the orientation of which, in combination with shaft rotation, provides the cam action that leads to piston reciprocation and thus pumping. The angle between a vector normal to the cam plane and the cylinder block axis of rotation, called the cam angle, is one variable that determines the displacement of the pump or the amount of fluid pumped per shaft revolution. Variable displacement units have the ability to vary the cam angle during operation whereas fixed displacement units do not.
- Reciprocating pistons. As the cylinder block rotates, the exposed ends of the pistons are constrained to follow the surface of the cam plane. Since the cam plane is at an angle to the axis of rotation, the pistons must reciprocate axially as they precess about the cylinder block axis. The axial motion of the pistons is sinusoidal. During the rising portion of the piston's reciprocation cycle, the piston moves toward the valve plate. Also, during this time, the fluid trapped between the buried end of the piston and the valve plate is vented to the pump's discharge port through one of the valve plate's semi-circular ports - the discharge port. As the piston moves toward the valve plate, fluid is pushed or displaced through the discharge port of the valve plate.
- Effect of precession. When the piston is at the top of the reciprocation cycle (commonly referred to as top-dead-center or just TDC), the connection between the trapped fluid chamber and the pump's discharge port is closed. Shortly thereafter, that same chamber becomes open to the pump's inlet port. As the piston continues to precess about the cylinder block axis, it moves away from the valve plate thereby increasing the volume of the trapped chamber. As this occurs, fluid enters the chamber from the pump's inlet to fill the void. This process continues until the piston reaches the bottom of the reciprocation cylinder - commonly referred to as bottom-dead-center or BDC. At BDC, the connection between the pumping chamber and inlet port is closed. Shortly thereafter, the chamber becomes open to the discharge port again and the pumping cycle starts over.
- Variable displacement. In a variable displacement pump, if the vector normal to the cam plane (swash plate) is set parallel to the axis of rotation, there is no movement of the pistons in their cylinders. Thus there is no output. Movement of the swash plate controls pump output from zero to maximum. There are two kinds of variable-displacement axial piston pumps:
  - direct displacement control pump, a kind of axial piston pump with a direct displacement control. A direct displacement control uses a mechanical lever attached to the swashplate of the axial piston pump. Higher system pressures require more force to move that lever, making direct displacement control only suitable for light or medium duty pumps. Heavy duty pumps require servo control. A direct displacement control pump contains linkages and springs and in some cases magnets rather than a shaft to a motor located outside of the pump (thereby reducing the number of moving parts), keeping parts protected and lubricated and reducing the resistance against the flow of liquid.
  - servo control pump.
- Pressure. In a typical pressure-compensated pump, the swash plate angle is adjusted through the action of a valve which uses pressure feedback so that the instantaneous pump output flow is exactly enough to maintain a designated pressure. If the load flow increases, pressure will momentarily decrease but the pressure-compensation valve will sense the decrease and then increase the swash plate angle to increase pump output flow so that the desired pressure is restored. In reality most systems use pressure as a control for this type of pump. The operating pressure reaches, say, 200 bar (20 MPa or 2900 psi) and the swash plate is driven towards zero angle (piston stroke nearly zero) and with the inherent leaks in the system allows the pump to stabilize at the delivery volume that maintains the set pressure. As demand increases the swash plate is moved to a greater angle, piston stroke increases and the volume of fluid increases; if the demand slackens the pressure will rise, and the pumped volume diminishes as the pressure rises. At maximum system pressure the output is once again almost zero. If the fluid demand increases beyond the capacity of the pump to deliver, the system pressure will drop to near zero. The swash plate angle will remain at the maximum allowed, and the pistons will operate at full stroke. This continues until system flow-demand eases and the pump's capacity is greater than demand. As the pressure rises the swash-plate angle modulates to try to not exceed the maximum pressure while meeting the flow demand.

== Design difficulties ==
Designers have a number of problems to overcome in designing axial piston pumps. One is managing to be able to manufacture a pump with the fine tolerances necessary for efficient operation. The mating faces between the rotary piston-cylinder assembly and the stationary pump body have to be almost a perfect seal while the rotary part turns at perhaps 3000 rpm. The pistons are usually less than half an inch (13 mm) in diameter with similar stroke lengths. Keeping the wall to piston seal tight means that very small clearances are involved and that materials have to be closely matched for similar coefficient of expansion.

The pistons have to be drawn outwards in their cylinder by some means. On small pumps this can be done by means of a spring inside the cylinder that forces the piston up the cylinder. Inlet fluid pressure can also be arranged so that the fluid pushes the pistons up the cylinder. Often a vane pump is located on the same drive shaft to provide this pressure and it also allows the pump assembly to draw fluid against some suction head from the reservoir, which is not an attribute of the unaided axial piston pump.

Another method of drawing pistons up the cylinder is to attach the cylinder heads to the surface of the swash plate. In that way the piston stroke is totally mechanical. However, the designer's problem of lubricating the swash plate face (a sliding contact) is made even more difficult.

Internal lubrication of the pump is achieved by use of the operating fluid—normally called hydraulic fluid. Most hydraulic systems have a maximum operating temperature, limited by the fluid, of about 120 °C (250 °F) so that using that fluid as a lubricant brings its own problems. In this type of pump the leakage from the face between the cylinder housing and the body block is used to cool and lubricate the exterior of the rotating parts. The leakage is then carried off to the reservoir or to the inlet side of the pump again. Hydraulic fluid that has been used is always cooled and passed through micrometre-sized filters before recirculating through the pump.

== Uses ==
Despite the problems indicated above this type of pump can contain most of the necessary circuit controls integrally (the swash-plate angle control) to regulate flow and pressure, be very reliable and allow the rest of the hydraulic system to be very simple and inexpensive.

Axial piston pumps are used to power the hydraulic systems of jet aircraft, being gear-driven off of the turbine engine's main shaft, The system used on the F-14 used a 9-piston pump that produced a standard system operating pressure of 3000 psi and a maximum flow of 84 gallons per minute.

Automotive air conditioning compressors for cabin cooling are nowadays mostly based around the axial piston pump design (others are based on the scroll compressor or rotary vane pump ones instead) in order to contain their weight and space requirement in the vehicle's engine bay and reduce vibrations. They're available in fixed displacement and dynamically adjusted variable displacement variants, and, depending upon the compressor's design, the actual rotating swashplate either directly drives a set of pistons mated to its edges through a set of hemispherical metal shoes, or a nutating plate on which a set of pistons are mounted by means of rods.

They are also used in some pressure washers. For example Kärcher has several models powered by axial piston pumps with three pistons.

Axial reciprocating motors are also used to power many machines. They operate on the same principle as described above, except that the circulating fluid is provided under considerable pressure and the piston housing is made to rotate and provide shaft power to another machine. A common use of an axial reciprocating motor is to power small earthmoving plant such as skid loader machines. Another use is to drive the screws of torpedoes.

== History ==
- The first example can be found on page 213 (or page 89 per book's pagination) in Le diverse et artificiose machine by Agostino Ramelli.
