= Rotodynamic pump =

A rotodynamic pump is a kinetic machine in which energy is continuously imparted to the pumped fluid by means of a rotating impeller, propeller, or rotor, in contrast to a positive-displacement pump in which a fluid is moved by trapping a fixed amount of fluid and forcing the trapped volume into the pump's discharge. Examples of rotodynamic pumps include adding kinetic energy to a fluid such as by using a centrifugal pump to increase fluid velocity or pressure.

== Introduction ==
A pump is a mechanical device generally used for raising liquid from a lower level to higher one. This is achieved by creating a low pressure at the inlet and high pressure at the outlet of the pump. Due to low inlet pressure, the liquid rises from where it is to be stored or supplied. However, work has to be done by a prime mover to enable it to impart mechanical energy to the liquid which ultimately converts into pressure energy.

Considering the basic principle of operation, pumps can be classified into two categories:

1. Positive-displacement pumps.
2. Non-positive-displacement pumps.

== Classification of pumps ==
Pumps are classified as follows:

=== Positive-displacement pumps ===
A positive-displacement pump operates by forcing a fixed volume of fluid from inlet pressure section of the pump into the discharge zone of the pump. It can be classified into two types:

1. Rotary-type positive-displacement pumps:
  - Internal gear pumps
  - Screw pumps
2. Reciprocating-type positive-displacement pumps:
  - Piston pumps
  - Diaphragm pumps

==== Rotary-type positive-displacement pumps ====
Positive-displacement rotary pump move the fluid by using a rotating mechanism that creates a vacuum that captures and draws in the liquid. Rotary positive-displacement pumps can be classified into two main types:

1. Gear pumps
2. Rotary vane pumps

==== Reciprocating positive-displacement pump ====
Reciprocating pumps move the fluid using one or more oscillating pistons, plungers or membranes, while valves limit fluid motion to the desired direction.

Pumps in this category are simple, with one or more cylinders. They can be either single-acting, with suction during one direction of the piston motion and discharge on the other, or double-acting, with suction and discharge in both directions.

=== Non-positive-displacement pumps ===
With this pump type, the volume of the liquid delivered for each cycle depends on the resistance offered to flow. A pump produces a force on the liquid that is constant for each particular speed of the pump. Resistance in a discharge line produces a force in the opposite direction. When these forces are equal, a liquid is in a state of equilibrium and does not flow. If the outlet of a non-positive-displacement pump is completely closed, the discharge pressure will rise to the maximum for a pump operating at a maximum speed.

==== Centrifugal pumps ====
Centrifugal pumps employ centrifugal force to lift liquids from a lower level to a higher level by developing pressure. A simplest type of pump comprises an impeller fitted onto a shaft, rotating in a volute casing. Liquid is led into the centre of the impeller (known as 'eye' of the impeller), and is picked up by the vanes of the impeller and accelerated to a high velocity by the vanes of the impeller, and discharged by the centrifugal force into the casing and then out the discharge pipe. When liquid is forced away from the centre, a vacuum is created and more liquid receives energy from the vanes and gains in pressure energy and kinetic energy. Since a large amount of kinetic energy is not desirable at the impeller outlet, an arrangement is made in the design to convert the kinetic energy of the liquid to pressure energy before the liquid enters the discharge pipe.

===== Types of rotodynamic pumps =====
Rotodynamic pumps can be classified by various factors such as design, construction, applications, service etc.

- By number of stages:
  - Single-stage pumps:
    - Also known as single impeller pumps
    - Simple and low-maintenance
    - Ideal for large flow rates and low-pressure installations
  - Two-stage pumps:
    - Two impellers in series
    - For medium-use applications
  - Multistage pumps:
    - Three or more impellers in series
    - For high-head applications
- By type of case split:
  - Axial split:
    - In these types of pumps the volute casing is split axially and the split line at which the pump casing separates is at the shaft's centerline.
    - They are typically mounted horizontally due to ease in installation and maintenance.
  - Radial split:
    - The pump case is split radially, the volute casing split is perpendicular to shaft centre line.
- By impeller design
  - Single-suction pumps:
    - It has single suction impeller which allows fluid to enter blades only through a single opening.
    - It has a simple design but the impeller has higher axial thrust imbalance due to flow coming through one side of impeller.
  - Double-suction pumps:
    - Double-suction impeller allows fluid to enter from both the sides of blades.
    - These are the most common types of pumps.
- By number of volutes:
  - Single-volute pumps:
    - Usually used for low capacity pumps due to small volute size
    - Casting small volutes is difficult but results in good quality
    - Have higher radial loads
  - Double volute pumps:
    - Have two volutes placed 180 degrees apart
    - Good at balancing radial loads
    - The most commonly used design
- By shaft orientation:
  - Horizontal centrifugal pumps:
    - Readily available
    - Easy to install, inspect, maintain and service
    - Suitable for low pressure
  - Vertical centrifugal pumps:
    - Require large headroom for installation, servicing and maintenance
    - Withstand higher pressure loads
    - More expensive than horizontal pumps

=== Working of a rotodynamic pump ===
Centrifugal pump is the most common used pumping device in the hydraulic world. In which the water comes from the tank at the center of the impeller and exits at the top of the pump. The impeller is called the heart of the system. Which have three types 1. Open impeller, 2. Semi-open impeller, 3. Enclosed impeller, in which the enclosed impeller gives the best efficiency. Enclosed impellers have a series of backward-curved vanes fitted between the two plates. It will always stay in the water. When impeller starts to rotate, the fluid in which the impeller lies will also rotate. When fluid starts to rotate, the centrifugal force will induced in the fluid particles. Due to centrifugal force, both pressure and kinetic energy of fluid will increases. As the centrifugal force occurs in the fluid particles, at the inlet nozzle (at the suction) side the pressure will decreases. The pressure will comparatively less than the atmospheric pressure. Such low pressure will help to suck the fluid from the storage. But if the inlet nozzle (at the suction) is empty or filled with the air it will damage the impeller. The difference between pressure created at the inlet nozzle (at the suction) and the atmospheric pressure will be very less to suck the fluid from the tank. The impeller if fitted inside the casing. So the fluid has to be inside the casing. Casing will be designed such that it will give maximum pressure at the exit. In casing, the maximum diameter or space is at exit (discharge nozzle) and as we move inside the diameter will gradually decrease. Due to this, the volume of the fluid is more at the discharge nozzle, so the velocity will decrease, and as velocity and pressure both are inversely proportional the pressure will increase. And the increase in pressure is required because to overcome the resistance of the pumping system.

If the pressure at the inlet nozzle (at the suction) goes below the pressure of vapor of the fluid, air bubbles created inside the casing. This situation is very dangerous for the pump because the fluid starts to boil and form the bubbles. Those bubbles will hit the impeller and it will spoil its material. This situation is known as the cavitation. To increase the pressure at the inlet nozzle (suction) we have to decrease the section head.

Those three types of impellers have its different usages. If the fluid is more cloggy then the semi open or the open type of impeller is used. But the efficiency will decreases respectively. And also the Mechanical design of the pump is difficult. The shaft is used to connect the impeller and the motor which will transfer the rotary motion to the impeller. The fluid pressure inside the casing is very high, a proper sealing arrangement is required.

=== Applications ===
Main industries where rotodynamic pumps are used include:

- General services: Cooling water, service water, firefighting, drainage
- Agriculture: Irrigation, borehole, land drainage
- Chemical/Petrochemical: Transfer
- Construction/building services: Pressure boosting, drainage, hot water circulation, air conditioning, boiler feed
- Dairy/Brewery: Transfer, ‘wort’, ‘wash’ to fermentation
- Domestic: Hot water
- Metal manufacture: Mill scale, furnace gas rubbing, descaling
- Mining/quarrying: Coal washing, ore washing, solids transport, dewatering, water jetting
- Oil/gas production: Main oil line, tanker loading, water injection, seawater lift
- Oil/gas refining: Hydrocarbon transfer, crude oil supply, tanker loading, product pipeline, reactor charge
- Paper/pulp: Medium/low consistency stock, wood chips, liquors/condensate, stock to head box
- Power generation: Large cooling water, ash handling, flue gas desulphurisation process, condensate extraction, boiler feed
- Sugar manufacture: Milk of lime/syrup, beet tailings, juices, whole beets
- Wastewater: Raw and settled sewage, grit laden flows, stormwater
- Water supply: Raw water extraction, supply distribution, boosting

=== See also ===
- Centrifugal pumps
- Impeller
- Roots blower
- Shaft
- Volute
- Suction
- Bernoulli's principle
