= Supercharger =

Air compressor for an internal combustion engine

A supercharger (item 6) on a piston engine

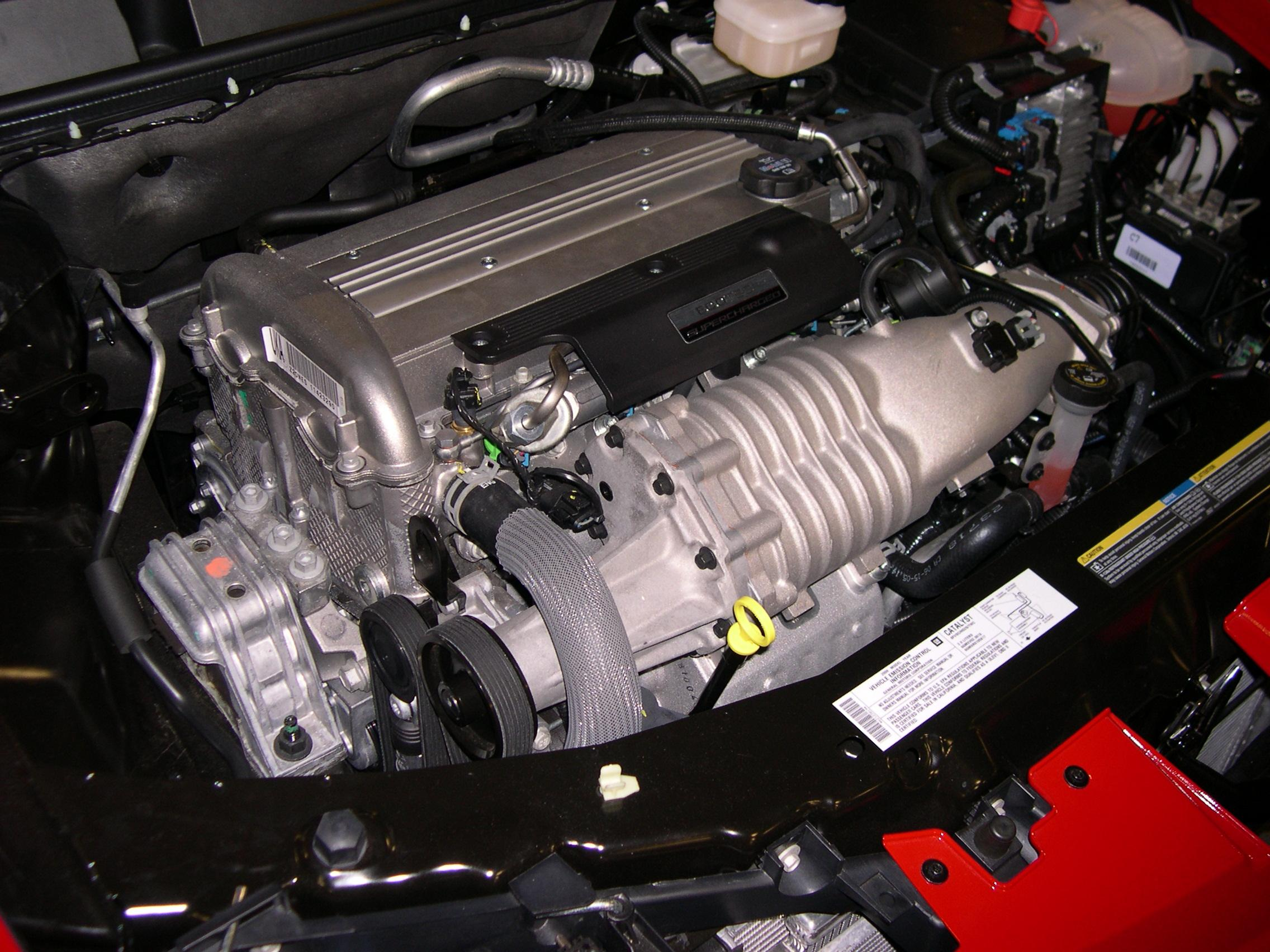
Roots-type Eaton M62 supercharger (right) on a 2006 Saturn (GM) Ion Redline Ecotec LSJ 4-cylinder engine

In an internal combustion engine, a supercharger is a device which compresses the intake gas, forcing more air into the engine in order to produce more power for a given displacement. It is a form of forced induction that is mechanically powered (usually by a belt from the engine's crankshaft), as opposed to a turbocharger, which is powered by the kinetic energy of the exhaust gases. However, up until the mid-20th century, a turbocharger was called a "turbosupercharger" and was considered a type of supercharger.

The first supercharged engine was built in 1878, with usage in aircraft engines beginning in the 1910s and usage in car engines beginning in the 1920s. In piston engines used by aircraft, supercharging was often used to compensate for the lower air density at high altitudes. Mechanical supercharging is less commonly used in the 21st century, as manufacturers have shifted to turbochargers to reduce fuel consumption and increase power outputs, especially with reduced engine displacements. Almost all diesels today are turbocharged.

A variant of the supercharger is the electric supercharger or e-supercharger, which uses an electric motor as its power source instead of a belt drive.

== Design ==
=== Types ===
There are two main families of superchargers defined according to the method of gas transfer: positive displacement and dynamic superchargers. Positive displacement superchargers deliver an almost constant level of boost pressure increase at all engine speeds, while dynamic superchargers cause the boost pressure to rise exponentially with engine speed (above a certain threshold). Another family of supercharger, albeit rarely used, is the pressure wave supercharger.

Roots blowers (a positive displacement lobe pump design) tend to be only 40–50% efficient at high boost levels, compared with 70–85% for dynamic superchargers. Lysholm-style blowers (a rotary-screw design) can be nearly as efficient as dynamic superchargers over a narrow range of load/speed/boost, for which the system must be specifically designed.

==== Positive displacement ====
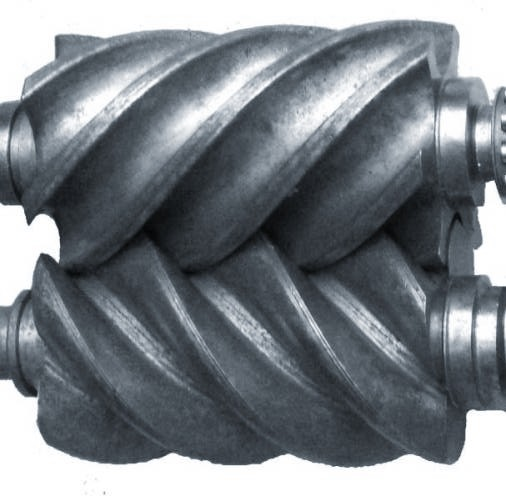
Internals of a rotary-screw (Lysholm) supercharger

Positive displacement pumps deliver a nearly fixed volume of air per revolution of the pump (except for leakage, which typically has a reduced effect at higher engine speeds). The most common type of positive-displacement supercharger is the Roots-type supercharger. These are blowers, not compressors, because the volume of the fluid transferred per revolution remains consistent between the intake and discharge sides of the pump. Other types include the rotary-screw, sliding-vane and scroll-type superchargers.

The rating system for positive-displacement superchargers is usually based on their capacity per revolution. In the case of the Roots blower, the GMC rating pattern is typical. The GMC rating is based on how many two-stroke cylinders – and the size of those cylinders – that it is designed to scavenge, with GMC's model range including 2–71, 3–71, 4–71 and 6–71 blowers. The 6–71 blower, for example, is designed to scavenge six cylinders of 71 cu in (1.16 L) each, resulting in an engine with a total displacement of 426 cu in (7.0 L)). However, because 6–71 is the engine's designation rather than that of the blower, the actual displacement of the blower is less; for example, a 6–71 blower pumps 339 cu in (5.6 L) per revolution. Other supercharger manufacturers have produced blowers rated up to 16–71.

==== Dynamic ====
Dynamic compressors rely on accelerating the air to high speed and then exchanging that velocity for pressure by diffusing or slowing it down.

Major types of a dynamic compressor are:

- Centrifugal
- Multi-stage axial-flow

=== Drive system ===
Common methods of driving a supercharger include:

- Belt (V-belt, synchronous belt, flat belt)
- Direct drive
- Gear drive
- Chain drive
- Variable speed ratio, variable ratio centrifugal
- Electric superchargers use electric motors rather than mechanical power sources.

=== Electric superchargers ===
Electric superchargers use an electric motor to compress intake air, providing boost without relying on mechanical power from the engine. This design offers immediate throttle response and eliminates turbo lag, making it beneficial for performance and efficiency.

=== Effects of fuel octane rating ===
Fuels with a higher octane rating are better able to resist autoignition and detonation. As a result, the amount of boost supplied by the superchargers could be increased, resulting in an increase in engine output. The development of 100-octane aviation fuel, pioneered in the USA in the 1930s, enabled the use of higher boost pressures to be used on high-performance aviation engines and was used to vastly increase the power output for several speed record airplanes.

Military use of high-octane fuels began in early 1940 when 100-octane fuel was delivered to the British Royal Air Force fighting in World War II. The German Luftwaffe also had supplies of a similar fuel. Increasing the octane rating became a major focus of aero engine development for the remainder of the war, with later fuels having up to a nominal 150-octane rating. Using such fuels, aero engines like the Rolls-Royce Merlin 66 and Daimler-Benz DB 605 DC produced power outputs of up to 2,000 hp (1,500 kW).

=== Heating of intake air ===
One disadvantage of forced induction (i.e. supercharging or turbocharging) is that compressing the intake air increases its temperature. For an internal combustion engine, the temperature of the intake air becomes a limiting factor in engine performance. Extreme temperatures can cause pre-ignition or knocking, which reduces performance and can cause engine damage. The risk of pre-ignition/knocking increases with higher ambient air temperatures and higher boost levels.

== Comparison with turbocharging ==
Superchargers draw power directly from the crankshaft; in contrast, turbochargers are driven from the pressure of exhaust gases produced by combustion. Thus, supercharged engines are typically less efficient in fuel economy from the constant, additional load required to drive the supercharger. However, turbochargers can suffer from turbo lag at lower RPMs, where the exhaust gas flow is initially insufficient to spin the turbocharger and achieve the desired boost level, thus leading to a delay in throttle response. This is often a result of a turbo charger which is too large for the engine displacement. For this reason, supercharged engines are common in applications where throttle response is a key concern, such as drag racing and tractor pulling competitions.

In design, superchargers have relatively simple piping from the air intake, through the supercharger and into the engine. Turbochargers have more complicated piping where the intake operates as with the supercharger but the exhaust must also pass through the turbocharger, requiring both intake and exhaust piping to come close together in an often crowded engine bay. As well, turbocharged engines are more prone to heat soak of the intake air, as extremely hot exhaust and turbo components are directly alongside the intake air system, although this can be solved through the use of an intercooler. Turbocharged engines utilize intercoolers more often than supercharged engines as a result.

=== Comparison for aircraft engines ===
The majority of aircraft engines used during World War II used mechanically driven superchargers because they had some significant manufacturing advantages over turbochargers. However, the benefit to the operational range was given a much higher priority to American aircraft because of a less predictable requirement on the operational range and having to travel far from their home bases. Consequently, turbochargers were mainly employed in American aircraft engines such as the Allison V-1710 and the Pratt & Whitney R-2800, which were comparably heavier when turbocharged, and required additional ducting of expensive high-temperature metal alloys in the gas turbine and a pre-turbine section of the exhaust system. The size of the ducting alone was a serious design consideration. For example, both the F4U Corsair and the P-47 Thunderbolt used the same radial engine, but the large barrel-shaped fuselage of the turbocharged P-47 was needed because of the amount of ducting to and from the turbocharger in the rear of the aircraft. The F4U used a two-stage inter-cooled supercharger with a more compact layout. Nonetheless, turbochargers were useful in high-altitude bombers and some fighter aircraft due to the increased high-altitude performance and range.

Turbocharged piston engines are also subject to many of the same operating restrictions as those of gas turbine engines. Turbocharged engines also require frequent inspections of their turbochargers and exhaust systems to search for possible damage caused by the extreme heat and pressure of the turbochargers. Such damage was a prominent problem in the early models of the American Boeing B-29 Superfortress high-altitude bombers used in the Pacific Theater of Operations during 1944–45.

Turbocharged piston engines continued to be used in a large number of postwar airplanes, such as the B-50 Superfortress, the KC-97 Stratofreighter, the Boeing 377 Stratocruiser, the Lockheed Constellation, and the C-124 Globemaster II.

=== Twincharging ===
In the 1985 and 1986 World Rally Championships, Lancia ran the Delta S4, which incorporated both a belt-driven supercharger and exhaust-driven turbocharger. The design used a complex series of bypass valves in the induction and exhaust systems as well as an electromagnetic clutch so that, at low engine speeds, a boost was derived from the supercharger. In the middle of the rev range, a boost was derived from both systems, while at the highest revs the system disconnected the drive from the supercharger and isolated the associated ducting. This was done in an attempt to exploit the advantages of each of the charging systems while removing the disadvantages. In turn, this approach brought greater complexity and affected the car's reliability in WRC events, as well as increasing the weight of engine ancillaries in the finished design.

Twincharged engines have occasionally been used in production cars, such as the 2005–2013 Volkswagen 1.4 litre, and select 2014-present Volvo B4204T 2.0 litre four-cylinder engines.

== History ==
In 1849, G. Jones of Birmingham, England began manufacturing a lobe pump compressor to provide ventilation for coal mines. In 1860, the Roots Blower Company (founded by brothers Philander and Francis Marion Roots) in the United States patented the design for an air mover for use in blast furnaces and other industrial applications. This air mover and Birmingham's ventilation compressor both used designs similar to that of the later Roots-type superchargers.

In March of 1878, German engineer Heinrich Krigar obtained the first patent for a screw-type compressor. The design was a two-lobe rotor assembly with identically-shaped rotors, however the design did not reach production.

Also in 1878, Scottish engineer Dugald Clerk designed the first supercharger which was used with an engine. This supercharger was used with a two-stroke gas engine. Gottlieb Daimler received a German patent for supercharging an internal combustion engine in 1885. Louis Renault patented a centrifugal supercharger in France in 1902.

=== Usage in cars ===
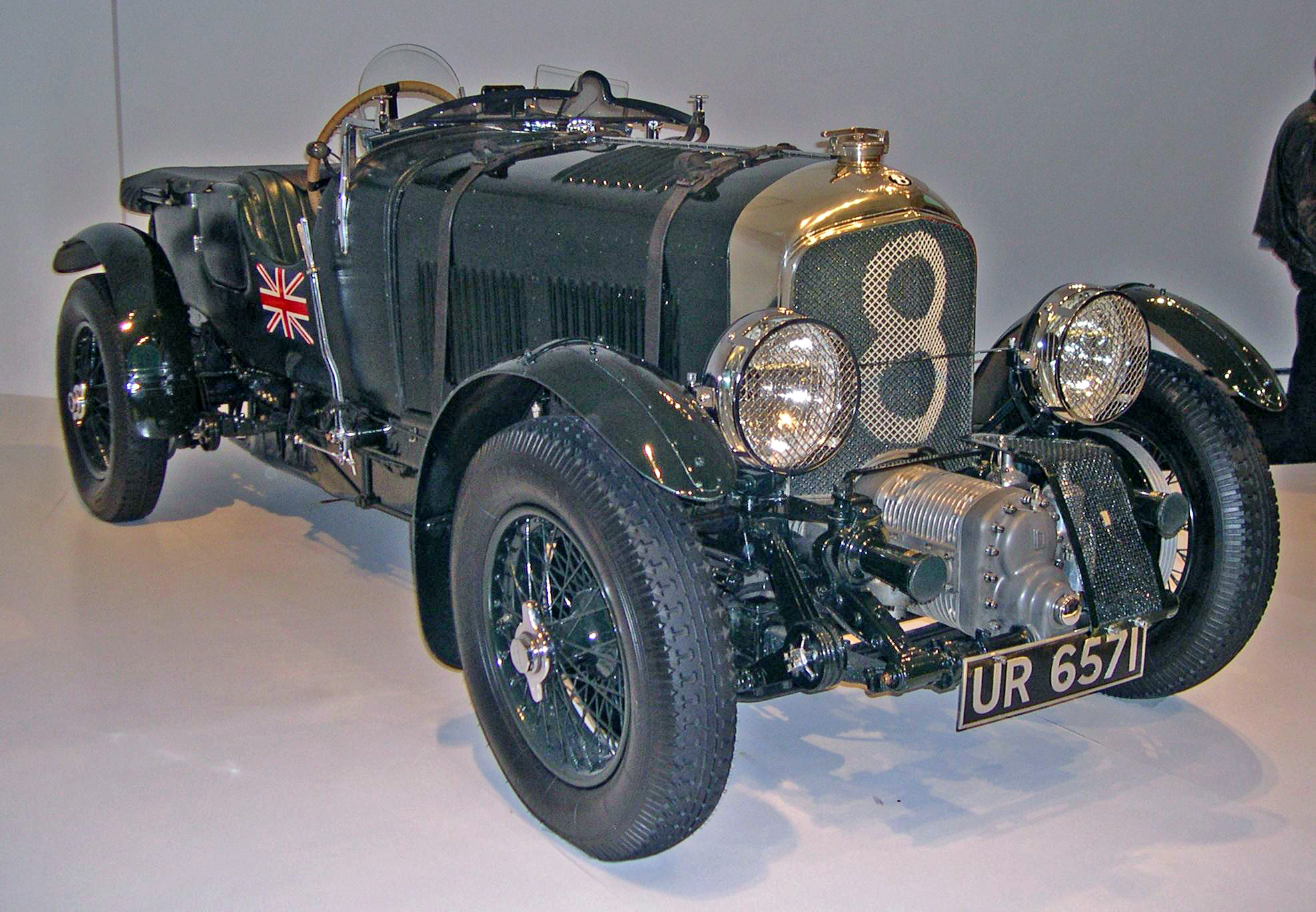
1929 Blower Bentley with the supercharger ("blower") located in front of the radiator

The world's first series-produced cars with superchargers were the 1.6 litre Mercedes 6/25 hp and 2.6 litre Mercedes 10/40 hp, both of which began production in 1923. They were marketed as Kompressor models, a term which was used for various models until 2012.

Supercharged racing cars from around this time included the 1923 Fiat 805-405 (the first to perform in and win a Grand Prix race), the 1923 Miller 122 the 1924 Alfa Romeo P2, the 1924 Grand Prix season car from Sunbeam, the 1925 Delage, and the 1926 Bugatti Type 35C.

Amongst the most famous supercharged cars is the Bentley 4½ Litre ("Blower Bentley"), which was introduced in 1929.

In 1935, the development of screw-type superchargers reached a milestone when Swedish engineer Alf Lysholm patented a design for a rotary-screw compressor with five female and four male rotors.

In the 21st century, supercharged production car engines have become less common, as manufacturers have shifted to turbocharging to achieve higher fuel economy and power outputs. For example, Mercedes-Benz's Kompressor engines of the early 2000s (such as the C 230 Kompressor straight-four, C 32 AMG V6, and CL 55 AMG V8 engines) were replaced around 2010 by turbocharged engines in models such as the C 250 and CL 65 AMG models. However, there are exceptions, such as the Audi 3.0 TFSI supercharged V6 (introduced in 2009) and the Jaguar AJ-V8 supercharged V8 (upgraded to the Gen III version in 2009).

=== Usage in aircraft ===
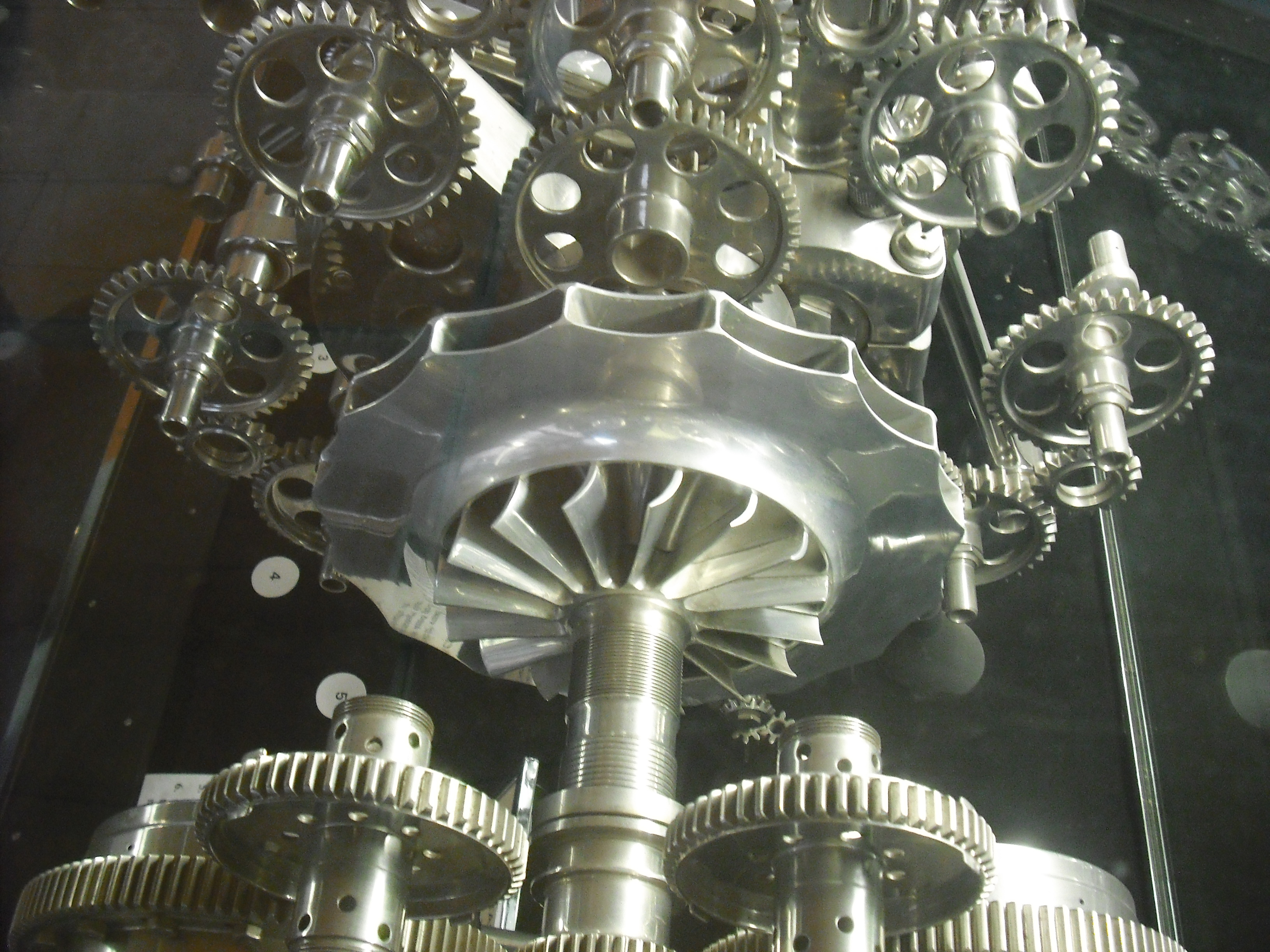
Centrifugal supercharger for a Bristol Centaurus radial engine

In the 1930s, two-speed drives were developed for superchargers for aero engines providing more flexible aircraft operation. The arrangement also entailed more complexity of manufacturing and maintenance. The gears connected the supercharger to the engine using a system of hydraulic clutches, which were initially manually engaged or disengaged by the pilot with a control in the cockpit. At low altitudes, the low-speed gear would be used, to prevent excessive boost levels. At higher altitudes, the supercharger could be switched to a higher gear to compensate for the reduced intake air density. In the Battle of Britain the Spitfire and Hurricane planes powered by the Rolls-Royce Merlin engine were equipped largely with single-stage and single-speed superchargers.

In 1942, two-speed two-stage supercharging with aftercooling was applied to the Rolls Royce Merlin 61 aero engine. The improved performance allowed the aircraft they powered to maintain a crucial advantage over the German aircraft they opposed throughout World War II, despite the German engines being significantly larger in displacement. Two-stage superchargers were also always two-speed. After the air was compressed in the low-pressure stage, the air flowed through a heat exchanger ("intercooler") where it was cooled before being compressed again by the high-pressure stage and then possibly also aftercooled in another heat exchanger.

While superchargers were highly used in the mid-1900s and during WWII, they have largely fallen out of use in modern piston-driven aircraft. This can largely be attributed to the higher temperature and lighter alloys that make turbochargers more efficient than superchargers, as well as the lower maintenance due to less moving parts.

== Usage in aircraft engines ==
=== Altitude effects ===
Due to the reduced air density at higher altitudes, supercharging has often been used in aircraft engines. For example, the air density at 30,000 ft (9,100 m) is 1/3 of that at sea level, resulting in 1/3 as much fuel being able to be burnt in a naturally aspirated engine, therefore the power output would be greatly reduced. A supercharger can be thought of either as artificially increasing the density of the air by compressing it or as forcing more air than normal into the cylinder every time the piston moves down on the intake stroke.

Since a supercharger is usually designed to produce a given amount of boost at high altitudes (where the air density is lower), the supercharger is often oversized for low altitude. To prevent excessive boost levels, the intake manifold pressure is often monitored. As the aircraft climbs and the air density drops, the throttle can be progressively opened to obtain the maximum safe power level for a given altitude. The altitude at which the throttle reaches full open and the engine is still producing full rated power is known as the critical altitude. Above the critical altitude, engine power output will reduce as the supercharger can no longer fully compensate for the decreasing air density.

Another issue encountered at low altitudes (such as at ground level) is that the intake air is warmer than at high altitude. Warmer air reduces the threshold at which engine knocking can occur, especially in supercharged or turbocharged engines. Methods to cool the intake air at ground level include intercoolers/aftercoolers, anti-detonant injection, two-speed superchargers and two-stage superchargers.

=== Intake freezing ===
In supercharged engines which use a carburetor, a partially-open throttle reduces the air pressure within the carburetor. In cold conditions, this low-pressure air can cause ice to form at the throttle plate. Significant quantities of ice can cause engine failure, even with the engine operating at full rated power in addition to the LSA supercharger.

== See also ==
- Boost gauge
- Forced induction
- Intercooler
- Naturally aspirated engine
- Turbocharger
