= Water well pump =

Pump used to extract well water

A water well pump is a pump that is used in extracting water from a water well.

Deep well pumps extract groundwater from subterranean aquifers, offering a reliable source of water independent of municipal networks. These pumps, often submersible and powered by electricity, can access water reserves located much deeper than shallow wells, ensuring a consistent supply even during periods of drought.

They include different kinds of pumps, most of them submersible pumps:

- Hand pump, manually operated
- Injector, a jet-driven pump
- Mechanical or rotary lobe pump requiring mechanical parts to pump water
- Solar-powered water pump
- Pump driven by air as used by the Amish
- Pump driven by air as used in the Australian outback
- Manual pumpless or hand pump wells requiring a human operator

The pump replaces the use of a bucket and pulley system to extract water.
