= Diaphragm (mechanical device) =

Flexible barrier between two chambers

In mechanics, a diaphragm is a sheet of a semi-flexible material anchored at its periphery and most often round in shape. It serves either as a barrier between two chambers, moving slightly up into one chamber or down into the other depending on differences in pressure, or as a device that vibrates when certain frequencies are applied to it.

A diaphragm pump uses a diaphragm to pump a fluid. A typical design is to have air on one side constantly vary in pressure, with fluid on the other side. The increase and decrease in volume caused by the action of the diaphragm alternately forces fluid out the chamber and draws more fluid in from its source. The action of the diaphragm is very similar to the action of a plunger with the exception that a diaphragm responds to changes in pressure rather than the mechanical force of the shaft.

A diaphragm pressure tank is a tank which has pressurant sealed inside on one side of the diaphragm. It is favored in certain applications due to its high durability and reliability. This comes with a downside, as the vessel needs to be replaced in the case of a rupture of the diaphragm. Diaphragm tanks are used to store hypergolic propellant aboard space probes and various other spacecraft.

Pressure regulators use diaphragms as part of their design. Most uses of compressed gasses, for example, in gas welding and scuba diving rely on regulators to deliver their gas output at appropriate pressures. Automotive fuel systems frequently require fuel-pressure regulators; this is true of many fuel injection systems as well as in vehicles fueled with liquefied petroleum gas (autogas) and compressed natural gas.

== See also ==
- Gas engine
- Hybrid vehicle
