= Thompson Pump and Manufacturing =

Thompson Pump and Manufacturing is a privately held pump manufacturer in Port Orange, Florida. It manufactures engine-powered pumps for construction, bypass, dewatering, wastewater, sewage, mining, petroleum, municipal, agriculture, military and industrial markets.

== History ==
The company was founded in 1970 by George A. Thompson and his sons, Bill and George Jr. The company was the first pump manufacturer to adapt a rotary pump to the dewatering industry. It manufactures all of its pumps in-house and manages sales, rentals and service through domestic and international field offices, as well as a network of third party distributors. George Jr. died in 1979 at age 25, and George Sr. retired in 1999.

== Products ==
Thompson Pump & Manufacturing's primary products are wet prime trash pumps, dry prime trash pumps with compressor-assisted or vacuum-assisted priming systems, sound attenuated trash pumps, hydraulic power units with submersible pump ends, diaphragm pumps, rotary wellpoint pumps and high pressure jet pumps. Patented, branded products and technologies include:

- Vacuum Underdrain Pipe - improves efficiency in shallow dewatering
- Arctic Knight - diesel driven pump for use down to -40°F
- Enviroprime - prevents sewage, debris and chemical discharge from escaping into environment
- Pumpology School - training program for students, contractors and others covering pump applications and technology
