= Flexible impeller =

Animated image showing the operation of a flexible–impeller pump

A flexible impeller pump is a positive-displacement pump that, by deforming impeller vanes, draws the liquid into the pump housing and moves it to the discharge port with a constant flow rate. The flexibility of the vanes enables a tight seal to the internal housing, making the pump self-priming, while also permitting bi-directional operation. The output from these pumps tends to be smooth or gentle when compared to the operation of a reciprocating pump (for example). In 1938, Arthur M. Briggs filed a patent for this type of pump.

== Types ==
- Execution: close coupled, bare shaft, with hydraulic motor, belt driven, gearmotor, mechanical speed variator, frequency converter,...
- Fittings: DIN 11851, Garolla, BSP, Macon, Triclover, SMS, BSM/RJT,...

== Uses ==
Particularly suitable for transfer of viscous, delicate, and slurry fluids even with high solid content. Widely used in the oenological field, food processing, chemical industry, cosmetic and marine field.

== Materials ==
Pump housing can be made of high grade stainless steel, bronze for marine applications, or other materials.

The impeller can be made of:

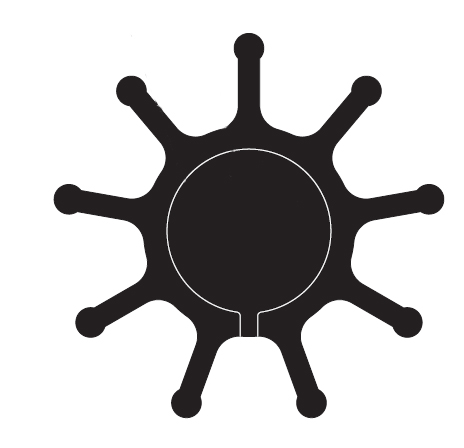
A flexible impeller

- Natural rubber (NR) - Excellent for water based liquid, highest mechanical resistance.
- Neoprene (CR) - Good balance between chemical and mechanical resistance.
- Nitrile (NBR) - Excellent resistance to oils and fats.
- EPDM - Best for hot fluid, for acid and alkaline fluids.
- Silicone (VMQ) - Best for very high temperature.

The end face mechanical seal can be made of:

- Ceramic
- Stainless steel
- Graphite
- Tungsten carbide
- Silicon carbide
- Elastomers, such as NBR, EPDM, or VITON
