= Hydraulic pump =

Mechanical power source

Fluid flow in an external gear pump

A hydraulic pump is a mechanical source of power that converts mechanical power into hydraulic energy (hydrostatic energy i.e. flow, pressure). Hydraulic pumps are used in hydraulic drive systems to generate flow with enough power to overcome pressure induced by a load at the pump outlet.

When a hydraulic pump operates, it creates a vacuum at the pump inlet, which forces liquid from the reservoir into the inlet line to the pump, and by mechanical action delivers this liquid to the pump outlet and forces it into the hydraulic system.

== Types of hydraulic pump ==
Hydraulic pumps can be grouped into positive displacement pumps and non-positive displacement pumps. Positive displacement pumps, also called hydrostatic pumps, move a set amount of fluid during each cycle of the pump mechanism by incorporating tightly fit pumping elements inside of the pump case to minimize internal fluid leakage to a negligible amount. The amount of fluid delivered by a positive displacement pump each cycle is defined by the type and geometry of the pump mechanism, and can either be a fixed volume (fixed displacement pump) or a variable volume (variable displacement pump) which is achieved by dynamically changing the geometry of the pump mechanism. Pumps in hydraulic drive systems are typically positive displacement pumps. Positive displacement pumps of various types all work on the principle of Pascal's law of fluid-pressure transmission.

Non-positive displacement pumps, also called hydrodynamic pumps, produce a continuous flow, and do not tightly seal the fluid inside of the pump mechanism. Fluid is able to slip within the pump because of the lack of sealing, which causes the output of the pump to change significantly as system pressure varies. Common examples of non-positive displacement pumps include centrifugal and propeller pumps. These pumps are typically used in applications requiring moving liquids in large amounts or at high velocity.

=== Gear pumps ===
Gearpump with external teeth, note the rotational direction of the gears.

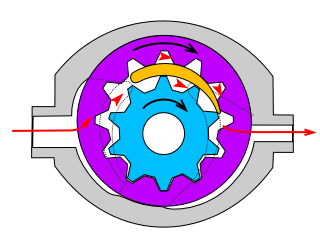
Gearpump with internal teeth

Gear pumps (with external teeth) (fixed displacement) are simple and economical pumps. The swept volume or displacement of gear pumps for hydraulics will be between about 1 to 200 milliliters. They have the lowest volumetric efficiency ($\eta_v \approx 90 \%$ ) of all three basic pump types (gear, vane and piston pumps) These pumps create pressure through the meshing of the gear teeth, which forces fluid around the gears to pressurize the outlet side. Some gear pumps can be quite noisy, compared to other types, but modern gear pumps are highly reliable and much quieter than older models. This is in part due to designs incorporating split gears, helical gear teeth and higher precision/quality tooth profiles that mesh and unmesh more smoothly, reducing pressure ripple and related detrimental problems. Another positive attribute of the gear pump is that catastrophic breakdown is a lot less common than in most other types of hydraulic pumps. This is because the gears gradually wear down the housing and/or main bushings, reducing the volumetric efficiency of the pump gradually until it is all but useless. This often happens long before wear and causes the unit to seize or break down. Hydraulic gear pumps are used in various applications where there are different requirements such as lifting, lowering, opening, closing, or rotating, and they are expected to be safe and long-lasting.

A gerotor (image does not show intake or exhaust)

=== Rotary vane pumps ===
Fixed displacement vane pump

A rotary vane pump is a positive-displacement pump that consists of vanes mounted to a rotor that rotates inside a cavity. In some cases these vanes can have variable length and/or be tensioned to maintain contact with the walls as the pump rotates. A critical element in vane pump design is how the vanes are pushed into contact with the pump housing, and how the vane tips are machined at this very point. Several type of "lip" designs are used, and the main objective is to provide a tight seal between the inside of the housing and the vane, and at the same time to minimize wear and metal-to-metal contact. Forcing the vane out of the rotating centre and towards the pump housing is accomplished using spring-loaded vanes, or more traditionally, vanes loaded hydrodynamically (via the pressurized system fluid).

=== Screw pumps ===
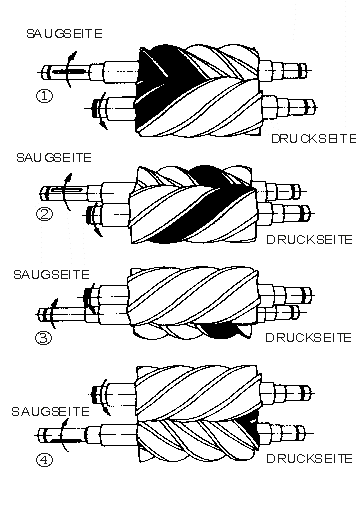
Principle of screw pump (Saugseite = intake, Druckseite = outflow)

Screw pumps (fixed displacement) consist of two Archimedes' screws that intermesh and are enclosed within the same chamber. These pumps are used for high flows at relatively low pressure (max 100 bars (10,000 kPa)). They were used on board ships where a constant pressure hydraulic system extended through the whole ship, especially to control ball valves but also to help drive the steering gear and other systems. The advantage of the screw pumps is the low sound level of these pumps; however, the efficiency is not high.

The major problem of screw pumps is that the hydraulic reaction force is transmitted in a direction that's axially opposed to the direction of the flow.

There are two ways to overcome this problem:

1. put a thrust bearing beneath each rotor;
2. create a hydraulic balance by directing a hydraulic force to a piston under the rotor.

Types of screw pumps:

1. single end
2. double end
3. single rotor
4. multi rotor timed
5. multi rotor untimed.

=== Bent axis pumps ===
Bent axis pumps, axial piston pumps and motors using the bent axis principle, fixed or adjustable displacement, exists in two different basic designs. The Thoma-principle (engineer Hans Thoma, Germany, patent 1935) with max 25 degrees angle and the Wahlmark-principle (Gunnar Axel Wahlmark, patent 1960) with spherical-shaped pistons in one piece with the piston rod, piston rings, and maximum 40 degrees between the driveshaft centerline and pistons (Volvo Hydraulics Co.). These have the best efficiency of all pumps. Although in general, the largest displacements are approximately one litre per revolution, if necessary a two-liter swept volume pump can be built. Often variable-displacement pumps are used so that the oil flow can be adjusted carefully. These pumps can in general work with a working pressure of up to 350–420 bars in continuous work.

=== Inline axial piston pumps ===
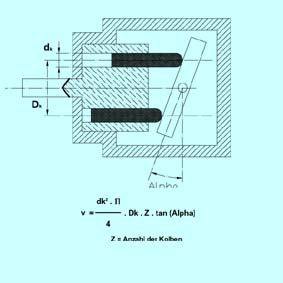
Axial piston pump, swashplate principle

By using different compensation techniques, the variable displacement type of these pumps can continuously alter fluid discharge per revolution and system pressure based on load requirements, maximum pressure cut-off settings, horsepower/ratio control, and even fully electro proportional systems, requiring no other input than electrical signals. This makes them potentially hugely power saving compared to other constant flow pumps in systems where prime mover/diesel/electric motor rotational speed is constant and required fluid flow is non-constant.

=== Radial piston pumps ===
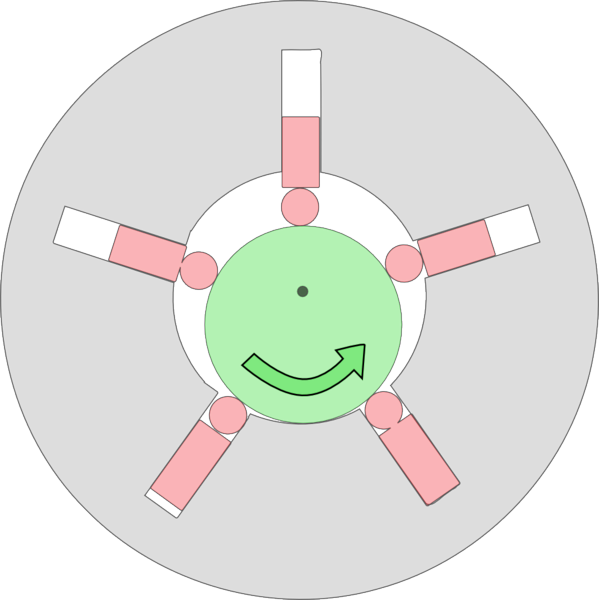
Radial piston pump

A radial piston pump is a form of hydraulic pump. The working pistons extend in a radial direction symmetrically around the drive shaft, in contrast to the axial piston pump.

== Hydraulic pumps, calculation formulas ==
=== Flow ===
$Q = n \cdot V_\text{stroke} \cdot \eta_\text{vol}$

where

- $\scriptstyle Q$, flow (m^{3}/s)
- $\scriptstyle n$, stroke frequency (Hz)
- $\scriptstyle V_\text{stroke}$, stroked volume (m^{3})
- $\scriptstyle \eta_\text{vol}$, volumetric efficiency

=== Power ===
$P = {n \cdot V_\text{stroke} \cdot \Delta p \over \eta_\text{mech}}$

where

- $\scriptstyle P$, power (W)
- $\scriptstyle n$, stroke frequency (Hz)
- $\scriptstyle V_\text{stroke}$, stroked volume (m^{3})
- $\scriptstyle \Delta p$, pressure difference over pump (Pa)
- $\scriptstyle \eta_\text{mech,hydr}$, mechanical/hydraulic efficiency

=== Mechanical efficiency ===
$n_\text{mech} = {T_\text{theoretical} \over T_\text{actual}} \cdot 100\%$

where

- $\scriptstyle n_\text{mech}$, mechanical pump efficiency percent
- $\scriptstyle T_\text{theoretical}$, theoretical torque to drive
- $\scriptstyle T_\text{actual}$, actual torque to drive

=== Hydraulic efficiency ===
$n_{hydr} = {Q_{actual} \over Q_{theoretical}} \cdot 100\%$

where

- $\scriptstyle n_{hydr}$, hydraulic pump efficiency
- $\scriptstyle Q_{theoretical}$, theoretical flow rate output
- $\scriptstyle Q_{actual}$, actual flow rate output
