= Rotary vane pump =

Type of positive-displacement pump

An eccentric rotary-vane pump

Another eccentric rotary-vane pump design.: 1. Pump housing; 2. Rotor; 3. Vanes; 4. Spring

A rotary-vane pump is a type of positive-displacement pump in which one or more vanes are mounted in or on a rotor that rotates inside a cavity. In the common eccentric design, the vanes move in and out as the rotor turns and remain in contact with the inner surface of the pump housing, forming chambers whose volumes increase and decrease during rotation.

One common application of this design is the oil-sealed rotary-vane vacuum pump. This type is widely used to produce rough and medium vacuum and as a backing pump for other vacuum pumps. Oil is used to seal, lubricate, and cool the pump, but its level and condition must be monitored, and it may be discharged as mist from the exhaust. Condensable vapours can contaminate the oil; a gas ballast may be used to reduce condensation within the pump.

== Types ==
The simplest vane pump has a circular rotor rotating inside a larger circular cavity. The centers of these two circles are offset, causing eccentricity. Vanes are mounted in slots cut into the rotor. The vanes are allowed a certain limited range of movement within these slots such that they can maintain contact with the wall of the cavity as the rotor rotates. The vanes may be encouraged to maintain such contact through means such as springs, gravity, or centrifugal force. A small amount of oil may be present within the mechanism to help create a better seal between the tips of the vanes and the cavity's wall. The contact between the vanes and the cavity wall divides up the cavity into "vane chambers" that do the pumping work. On the suction side of the pump, the vane chambers are increased in volume and are thus filled with fluid forced in by the inlet vacuum pressure, which is the pressure from the system being pumped, sometimes just the atmosphere. On the discharge side of the pump, the vane chambers decrease in volume, compressing the fluid and thus forcing it out of the outlet. The action of the vanes pulls through the same volume of fluid with each rotation.

Multi-stage rotary-vane vacuum pumps, which force the fluid through a series of two or more rotary-vane pump mechanisms to enhance the pressure, can attain vacuum pressures as low as 10^{−6} bar (0.1 Pa).

== Uses ==
Vane pumps are commonly used as high-pressure hydraulic pumps and in automobiles, including supercharging, power-steering, air conditioning, and automatic-transmission pumps. Pumps for mid-range pressures include applications such as carbonators for fountain soft-drink dispensers and espresso coffee machines. Furthermore, vane pumps can be used in low-pressure gas applications such as secondary air injection for auto exhaust emission control, or in low-pressure chemical vapor deposition systems.

Rotary-vane pumps are also a common type of vacuum pump, with two-stage pumps able to reach pressures well below 10^{−6} bar. These are found in such applications as providing braking assistance in large trucks and diesel-powered passenger cars (whose engines do not generate intake vacuum) through a braking booster, in most light aircraft to drive gyroscopic flight instruments, in evacuating refrigerant lines during installation of air conditioners, in laboratory freeze dryers, and vacuum experiments in physics. In the vane pump, the pumped gas and the oil are mixed within the pump, and so they must be separated externally. Therefore, the inlet and the outlet have a large chamber, perhaps with swirl, where the oil drops fall out of the gas. Sometimes the inlet has louvers cooled by the room air (the pump is usually 40 K hotter) to condense cracked pumping oil and water, and let it drop back into the inlet. When these pumps are used in high-vacuum systems (where the inflow of gas into the pump becomes very low), a significant concern is contamination of the entire system by molecular oil back streaming.

== History ==
Like many simple mechanisms, it is unclear when the rotary vane pump was invented. Agostino Ramelli's 1588 book Le diverse et artificiose machine del capitano Agostino Ramelli ("The Various and Ingenious Machines of Captain Agostino Ramelli") contains a description and an engraving of a rotary vane pump along with other types of rotary pumps, which suggests that the design was known at the time. In more recent times, vane pumps also show up in 19th-century patent records. In 1858, a US patent was granted to one W. Pierce for "a new and useful Improvement in Rotary Pumps", which acknowledged as prior art sliding blades "used in connection with an eccentric inner surface". In 1874, a Canadian patent was granted to Charles C. Barnes of Sackville, New Brunswick. There have been various improvements since, including a variable vane pump for gases (1909).

== Variable-displacement vane pump ==
One of the major advantages of the vane pump is that the design readily lends itself to become a variable-displacement pump, rather than a fixed-displacement pump such as a spur-gear or a gerotor pump. The centerline distance from the rotor to the eccentric ring is used to determine the pump's displacement. By allowing the eccentric ring to pivot or translate relative to the rotor, the displacement can be varied. It is even possible for a vane pump to pump in reverse if the eccentric ring moves far enough. However, performance cannot be optimized to pump in both directions. This can make for a very interesting hydraulic-control oil pump.

A variable-displacement vane pump is used as an energy-saving device and has been used in many applications, including automotive transmissions.

== Materials ==
- Externals (head, casing) – cast iron, ductile iron, steel, brass, plastic, and stainless steel
- Vane, pushrods – carbon graphite, PEEK
- End plates – carbon graphite
- Shaft seal – component mechanical seals, industry-standard cartridge mechanical seals, and magnetically driven pumps
- Packing – available from some vendors, but not usually recommended for thin liquid service

== See also ==
- Guided-rotor compressor
- Powerplus supercharger
