= Screw pump =

Positive-displacement pump

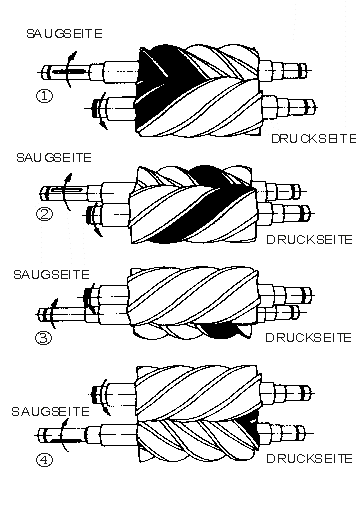
Principle of screw pump (Saugseite = intake, Druckseite = outflow)

A screw pump is a positive-displacement pump that use one or several screws to move fluid solids or liquids along the screw(s) axis.

== History ==
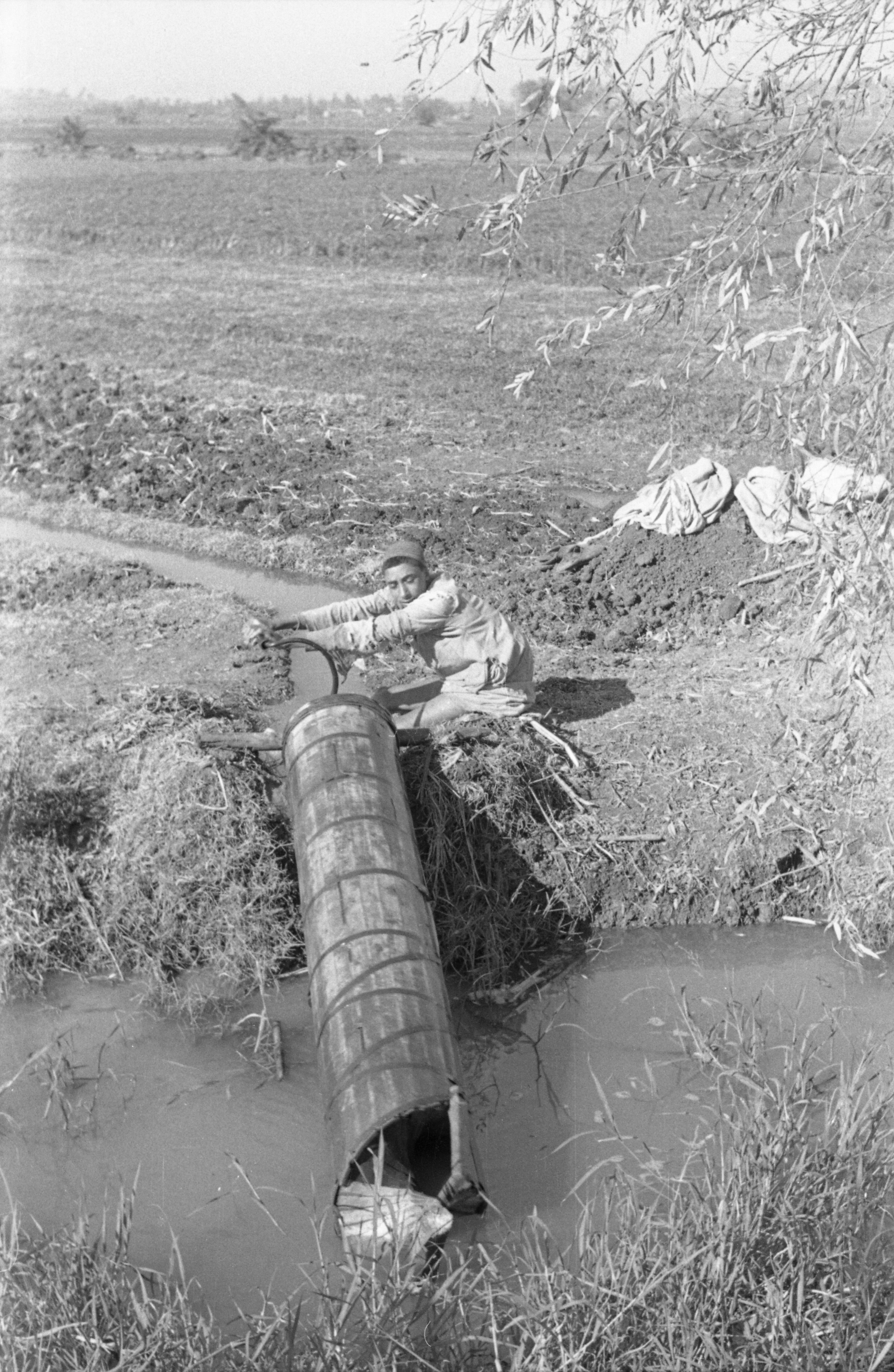
Irrigation Pump in Egypt, 1950s

The screw pump is the oldest positive displacement pump. The first records of a water screw, or screw pump, dates back to Ancient Egypt before the 3rd century BC. The Egyptian screw, used to lift water from the Nile, was composed of tubes wound round a cylinder; as the entire unit rotates, water is lifted within the spiral tube to the higher elevation. A later screw pump design from Egypt had a spiral groove cut on the outside of a solid wooden cylinder and then the cylinder was covered by boards or sheets of metal closely covering the surfaces between the grooves.

A cuneiform inscription of Assyrian king Sennacherib (704–681 BC) has been interpreted by Stephanie Dalley to describe casting water screws in bronze some 350 years earlier. This is consistent with classical author Strabo, who describes the Hanging Gardens as watered by screws.

The screw pump was later introduced from Egypt to Greece. It was described by Archimedes, on the occasion of his visit to Egypt, circa 234 BC. This suggests that the apparatus was unknown to the Greeks before Hellenistic times.

== Design ==
Three principal forms exist; In its simplest form (the Archimedes' screw pump or 'water screw'), a single screw rotates in a cylindrical cavity, thereby gravitationally trapping some material on top of a section of the screw as if it was a scoop, and progressively moving the material along the screw's axle until it is discharged at the top. This ancient construction is still used in many low-tech applications, such as irrigation systems and in agricultural machinery for transporting grain and other solids. The second form works differently; it squeezes a trapped pocket of material against another screw. This form is what is typically referred to in modern times with the term 'screw pump'. The third form (the progressive cavity pump or eccentric screw pump) squeezes a trapped pocket of material against the cavity walls by spinning the screw eccentrically.

Like all positive-displacement pumps, all various kinds of screw pumps function by trapping a volume of material somehow, and then moving it. There are numerous ways to shape the screw or the cavity to accomplish this function, and the number of screws working together can be many. The term 'screw pump' refers generically to all of these types. However, this generalization can be a pitfall as it fails to recognize that the different ‘screw' configurations have different advantages and design considerations for each, which lead to the various kinds being suitable for very different use cases, material types, flow rates, and pressures.

One of the most common configurations of a screw pump is the three-spindle screw pump. Three screws press against each other to form pockets of the pumped liquid in the grooves of the screws. As the screws rotate in opposite directions, the pumped liquid moves along the screws' spindles. There is nothing magical about two, three or any number of screws; pockets are formed regardless. Three rather than two spindles are used because this allows the central screw to experience symmetrical pressure loading from all sides. This ensures that the central screw is not pushed sideways, will not be bent, and thus eliminates the need for radial bearings on the main axle to absorb radial forces. The two side screws can then be made as internally-hidden free-floating rollers, lubricated by the pumped liquid itself, thus eliminating the need for bearings on those axles. This is commonly desired because seals and bearings on machines are common sources of failure.

Three-spindle screw pumps are most often used for transport of viscous fluids with lubricating properties. They are suited for a variety of applications such as fuel-injection, oil burners, boosting, hydraulics, fuel, lubrication, circulating, feed, and to pump high-pressure viscous fluids in offshore and marine installations.

Compared to various other pumps, screw pumps have several advantages. The pumped fluid is moving axially without turbulence which eliminates foaming that would otherwise occur in viscous fluids. They are also able to pump fluids of higher viscosity without losing flow rate. Also, changes in the pressure difference have little impact on screw pumps compared to various other pumps. There is also very little back-drive on the power axle, and the output of the flow is typically very even and doesn't pulsate much.

== See also ==
- Rotary-screw compressor, a gas compressor similar to a screw pump.
