= Lobe pump =

Type of positive displacement pump

A lobe pump, or rotary lobe pump, is a type of positive displacement pump. It is similar to a gear pump except the lobes are designed to almost meet, rather than touch and turn each other. An early example of a lobe pump is the Roots Blower, patented in 1860 to blow combustion air to melt iron in blast furnaces, but now more commonly used as an engine supercharger.

Lobe pumps are used in a variety of industries including pulp and paper, chemical, food, beverage, pharmaceutical, and biotechnology. They are popular in these diverse industries because they offer superb sanitary qualities, high efficiency, reliability, corrosion resistance and good clean-in-place and sterilization-in-place (CIP/SIP) characteristics.

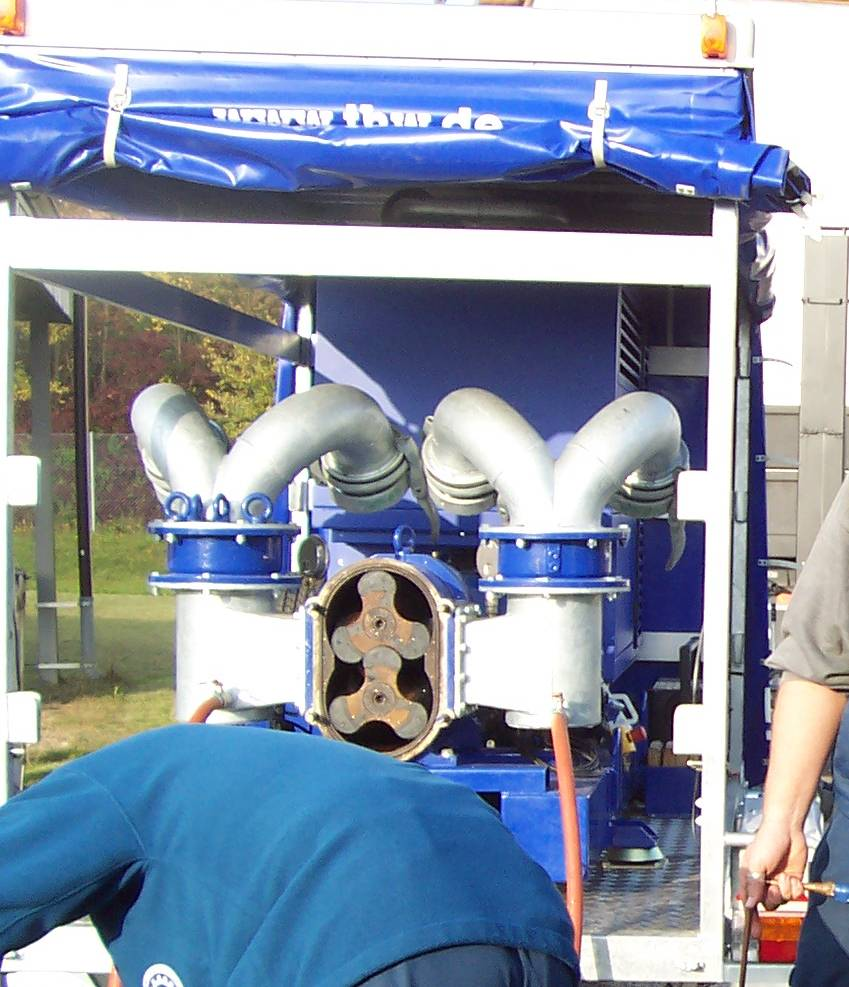
Lobe pump (5 m^{3}/min or 1886 barrel/h) of THW

Rotary pumps can handle solids (e.g., cherries and olives), slurries, pastes, and a variety of liquids. If wetted, they offer self-priming performance. A gentle pumping action minimizes product degradation. They also offer continuous and intermittent reversible flows and can operate dry for brief periods of time. Flow is relatively independent of changes in process pressure, too, so output is relatively constant and continuous.

== Function ==
lobe pump internals

Lobe pumps are similar to external gear pumps in operation in that fluid flows around the interior of the casing. Unlike external gear pumps, however, the lobes do not make contact. Lobe contact is prevented by external timing gears located in the gearbox. Pump shaft support bearings are located in the gearbox, and since the bearings are out of the pumped liquid, pressure is limited by bearing location and shaft deflection which reduces the noise levels of this pump. Lobe pump is one of the Positive Displacement Pump rotary type.

1. As the lobes come out of mesh, they create an expanding volume on the inlet side of the pump. Material to be pumped (liquid, or gas, possibly containing small solid particles) flows into this cavity. Rotation of the lobes past the inlet port creates enclosed volumes of material between the rotors and the pump casing.

2. The material travels around the interior of the casing in these enclosed volumes between the rotor's lobes and the casing — it does not pass between the lobes.

3. Finally, the meshing of the lobes on the discharge side of the pump prevents the pumped material from returning to the inlet side. Continued pumping forces the pumped material out through the outlet port. If the discharge port is restricted - such as discharging a large volume of air into an engine's intake manifold - then pressure is created in the discharge space. A lobe pump itself does not compress the material it pumps.

Lobe pumps are frequently used in food applications because they handle solids without damaging the product. Particle size pumped can be much larger in lobe pumps than in other positive displacement types. Since the lobes do not make contact, and clearances are not as close as in other Positive displacement pumps, this design handles low viscosity liquids with diminished performance. Loading characteristics are not as good as other designs, and suction ability is low. High-viscosity liquids require reduced speeds to achieve satisfactory performance. Reductions of 25% of rated speed and lower are common with high-viscosity liquids.

== See also ==
- Positive displacement pump
- Gear pump
- Progressing Cavity Pump
- Multistage Screw Pump
- Applications of Lobe Pump
