= Fluid coupling =

Device used to transmit rotating mechanical power

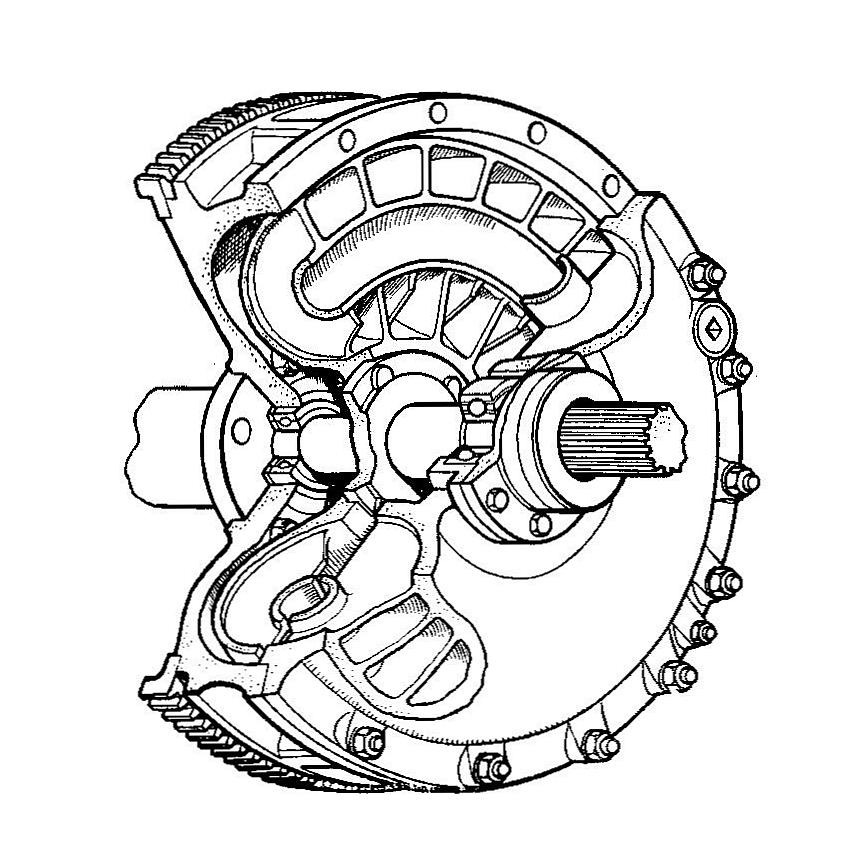
Daimler car fluid flywheel of the 1930s

A fluid coupling or hydraulic coupling is a hydrodynamic or 'hydrokinetic' device used to transmit rotating mechanical power. It has been used in automobile transmissions as an alternative to a mechanical clutch. It also has widespread application in marine and industrial machine drives, where variable speed operation and controlled start-up without shock loading of the power transmission system is essential.

Hydrokinetic drives, such as this, should be distinguished from hydrostatic drives, such as hydraulic pump and motor combinations.

== History ==
The fluid coupling originates from the work of Hermann Föttinger, who was the chief designer at the AG Vulcan Works in Stettin. His patents from 1905 covered both fluid couplings and torque converters.

Dr Gustav Bauer of the Vulcan-Werke collaborated with English engineer Harold Sinclair of Hydraulic Coupling Patents Limited to adapt the Föttinger coupling to vehicle transmission in an attempt to mitigate the lurching Sinclair had experienced while riding on London buses during the 1920s Following Sinclair's discussions with the London General Omnibus Company begun in October 1926, and trials on an Associated Daimler bus chassis, Percy Martin of Daimler decided to apply the principle to the Daimler group's private cars.

During 1930 The Daimler Company of Coventry, England began to introduce a transmission system using a fluid coupling and Wilson self-changing gearbox for buses and their flagship cars. By 1933 the system was used in all new Daimler, Lanchester and BSA vehicles produced by the group from heavy commercial vehicles to small cars. It was soon extended to Daimler's military vehicles and in 1934 was featured in the Singer Eleven branded as Fluidrive. These couplings are described as constructed under Vulcan-Sinclair and Daimler patents.

In 1939 General Motors Corporation introduced Hydramatic drive, the first fully automatic automotive transmission system installed in a mass-produced automobile. The Hydramatic employed a fluid coupling.

The first diesel locomotives using fluid couplings were also produced in the 1930s.

== Overview ==
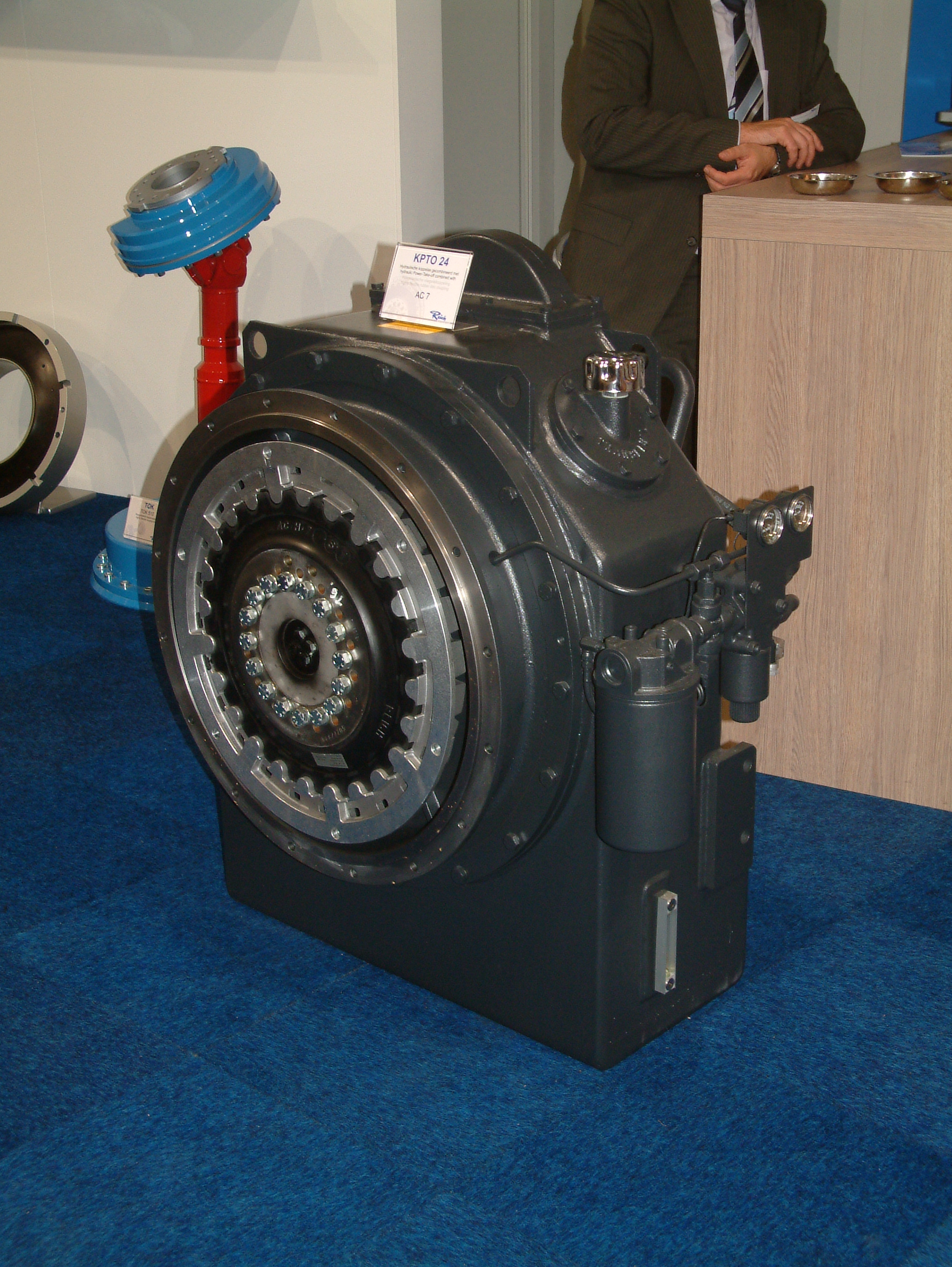
Fluid coupling on Transfluid's industrial transmission model KPTO

A fluid coupling consists of three components, plus the hydraulic fluid:

- The housing, also known as the shell (which must have an oil-tight seal around the drive shafts), contains the fluid and turbines.
- Two turbines (fanlike components):
  - One connected to the input shaft; known as the pump or impeller, or primary wheel input turbine.
  - The other connected to the output shaft, known as the turbine, output turbine, secondary wheel or runner

The driving turbine, known as the 'pump', (or driving torus (Note: A General Motors term)) is rotated by the prime mover, which is typically an internal combustion engine or electric motor. The impeller's motion imparts both outwards linear and rotational motion to the fluid.

The hydraulic fluid is directed by the 'pump' whose shape forces the flow in the direction of the 'output turbine' (or driven torus). Here, any difference in the angular velocities of 'input stage' and 'output stage' result in a net force on the 'output turbine' causing a torque; thus causing it to rotate in the same direction as the pump.

The motion of the fluid is effectively toroidal - travelling in one direction on paths that can be visualised as being on the surface of a torus:

- If there is a difference between input and output angular velocities the motion has a poloidal component
- If the input and output stages have identical angular velocities there is no net centripetal force - and the motion of the fluid is circular and co-axial with the axis of rotation (i.e. round the edges of a torus), there is no flow of fluid from one turbine to the other.

=== Stall speed ===
An important characteristic of a fluid coupling is its stall speed. The stall speed is defined as the highest speed at which the pump can turn when the output turbine is locked and full input torque (at the stall speed) is applied. Under stall conditions all of the engine's power at that speed would be dissipated in the fluid coupling as heat, possibly leading to damage.

=== Step-circuit coupling ===
A modification to the simple fluid coupling is the step-circuit coupling which was formerly manufactured as the "STC coupling" by the Fluidrive Engineering Company.

The STC coupling contains a reservoir to which some, but not all, of the oil gravitates when the output shaft is stalled. This reduces the "drag" on the input shaft, resulting in reduced fuel consumption when idling and a reduction in the vehicle's tendency to "creep".

When the output shaft begins to rotate, the oil is thrown out of the reservoir by centrifugal force, and returns to the main body of the coupling, so that normal power transmission is restored.

=== Slip ===
A fluid coupling cannot develop output torque when the input and output angular velocities are identical. Hence, a fluid coupling cannot achieve 100 percent power transmission efficiency. Due to slippage that will occur in any fluid coupling under load, some power will always be lost in fluid friction and turbulence, and dissipated as heat. Like other fluid dynamical devices, its efficiency tends to increase gradually with increasing scale, as measured by the Reynolds number.

=== Hydraulic fluid ===
As a fluid coupling operates kinetically, low-viscosity fluids are preferred. Generally speaking, multi-grade motor oils or automatic transmission fluids are used. Increasing density of the fluid increases the amount of torque that can be transmitted at a given input speed. However, hydraulic fluids, much like other fluids, are subject to changes in viscosity with temperature change. This leads to a change in transmission performance and so where unwanted performance/efficiency change has to be kept to a minimum, a motor oil or automatic transmission fluid with a high viscosity index should be used.

=== Hydrodynamic braking ===
Fluid couplings can also act as hydrodynamic brakes, dissipating rotational energy as heat through frictional forces (both viscous and fluid/container). When a fluid coupling is used for braking it is also known as a retarder.

=== Scoop control ===
Correct operation of a fluid coupling depends on it being correctly filled with fluid. An under-filled coupling will be unable to transmit the full torque, and the limited fluid volume is also likely to overheat, often with damage to the seals.

If a coupling is deliberately designed to operate safely when under-filled, usually by providing an ample fluid reservoir which is not engaged with the impeller, then controlling its fill level may be used to control the torque which it can transmit, and in some cases to also control the speed of a load. (Note: Where the torque needed to drive a load is proportionate to its speed.)

Controlling the fill level is done with a 'scoop', a non-rotating pipe which enters the rotating coupling through a central, fixed hub. By moving this scoop, either rotating it or extending it, it scoops up fluid from the coupling and returns it to a holding tank outside the coupling. The oil may be pumped back into the coupling when needed, or some designs use a gravity feed - the scoop's action is enough to lift fluid into this holding tank, powered by the coupling's rotation.

Scoop control can be used for easily managed and stepless control of the transmission of very large torques. The Fell diesel locomotive, a British experimental diesel railway locomotive of the 1950s, used four engines and four couplings, each with independent scoop control, to engage each engine in turn. It is commonly used to provide variable speed drives.

== Applications ==
=== Industrial ===
Fluid couplings are used in many industrial application involving rotational power, especially in machine drives that involve high-inertia starts or constant cyclic loading.

=== Rail transportation ===
Fluid couplings are found in some Diesel locomotives as part of the power transmission system. Self-Changing Gears made semi-automatic transmissions for British Rail, and Voith manufacture turbo-transmissions for diesel multiple units which contain various combinations of fluid couplings and torque converters.

=== Automotive ===
Fluid couplings were used in a variety of early semi-automatic transmissions and automatic transmissions. Since the late 1940s, the hydrodynamic torque converter has replaced the fluid coupling in automotive applications.

In automotive applications, the pump typically is connected to the flywheel of the engine—in fact, the coupling's enclosure may be part of the flywheel proper, and thus is turned by the engine's crankshaft. The turbine is connected to the input shaft of the transmission. While the transmission is in gear, as engine speed increases, torque is transferred from the engine to the input shaft by the motion of the fluid, propelling the vehicle. In this regard, the behaviour of the fluid coupling strongly resembles that of a mechanical clutch driving a manual transmission.

Fluid flywheels, as distinct from torque converters, are best known for their use in Daimler cars in conjunction with a Wilson pre-selector gearbox. Daimler used these throughout their range of luxury cars, until switching to automatic gearboxes with the 1958 Majestic. Daimler and Alvis were both also known for their military vehicles and armoured cars, some of which also used the combination of pre-selector gearbox and fluid flywheel.

=== Aviation ===
The most prominent use of fluid couplings in aeronautical applications was in the DB 601, DB 603 and DB 605 engines where it was used as a barometrically controlled hydraulic clutch for the centrifugal compressor and the Wright turbo-compound reciprocating engine, in which three power recovery turbines extracted approximately 20 percent of the energy or about 500 horsepower (370 kW) from the engine's exhaust gases and then, using three fluid couplings and gearing, converted low-torque high-speed turbine rotation to low-speed, high-torque output to drive the propeller.

== Calculations ==
Generally speaking, the power transmitting capability of a given fluid coupling is strongly related to pump speed, a characteristic that generally works well with applications where the applied load does not fluctuate to a great degree. The torque transmitting capacity of any hydrodynamic coupling can be described by the expression $r\,N^2D^5$, where $r$ is the mass density of the fluid (kg/m^{3}), $N$ is the impeller speed (rpm), and $D$ is the impeller diameter (m). In the case of automotive applications, where loading can vary to considerable extremes, $r\,N^2D^5$ is only an approximation. Stop-and-go driving will tend to operate the coupling in its least efficient range, causing an adverse effect on fuel economy.

== Manufacture ==
Fluid couplings are relatively simple components to produce. For example, the turbines can be aluminium castings or steel stampings and the housing can also be a casting or made from stamped or forged steel.

Manufacturers of industrial fluid couplings include Voith, Transfluid, TwinDisc, Siemens, Parag, Fluidomat, Reuland Electric and TRI Transmission and Bearing Corp.

== Patents ==
List of fluid coupling patents.

This is not an exhaustive list but is intended to give an idea of the development of fluid couplings in the 20th century.

Patent number	Publication date	Inventor	Link
GB190906861	02 Dec 1909	Hermann Föttinger	
US1127758	09 Feb 1915	Jacob Christian Hansen-Ellehammer	
US1199359	26 Sep 1916	Hermann Föttinger	
US1472930	06 Nov 1923	Fritz Mayer	
GB359501	23 Oct 1931	Voith	
US1937364	28 Nov 1933	Harold Sinclair	
US1987985	15 Jan 1935	Schmieske and Bauer	
US2004279	11 Jun 1935	Hermann Föttinger	
US2127738	23 Aug 1938	Fritz Kugel	
US2202243	28 May 1940	Noah L Alison	
US2264341	02 Dec 1941	Arthur and Sinclair	
US2491483	20 Dec 1949	Gaubatz and Dolza	
US2505842	02 May 1950	Harold Sinclair	
US2882683	21 Apr 1959	Harold Sinclair	

== See also ==
- Secondary-controlled hydraulic drive
- Torque amplifier
- Torque converter
- Water brake
