= Banjo fitting =

Connecting unit for fluid transfer

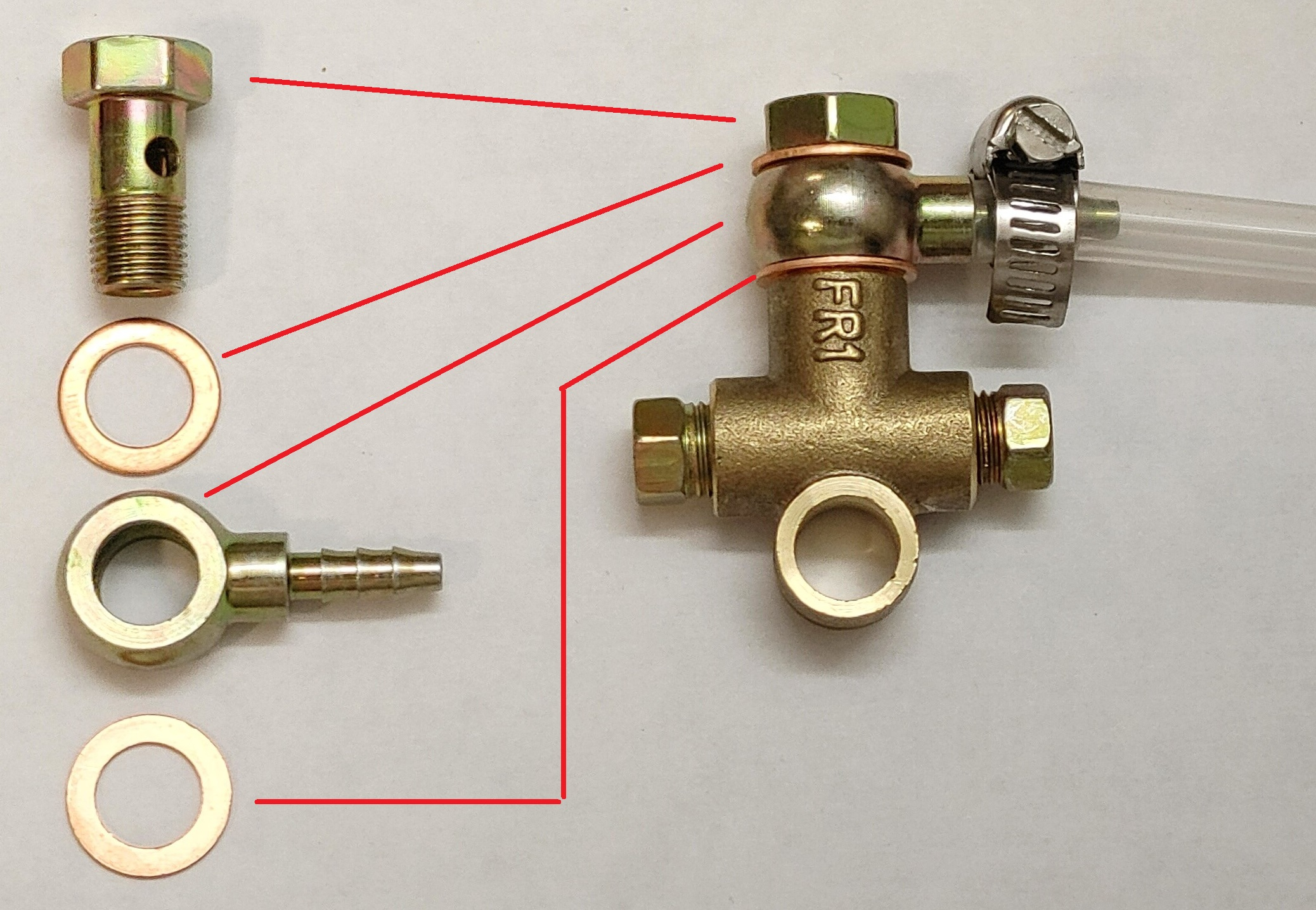
An example of typical banjo fitting components (left) with an identical fitting connecting a hose to a tee fitting.

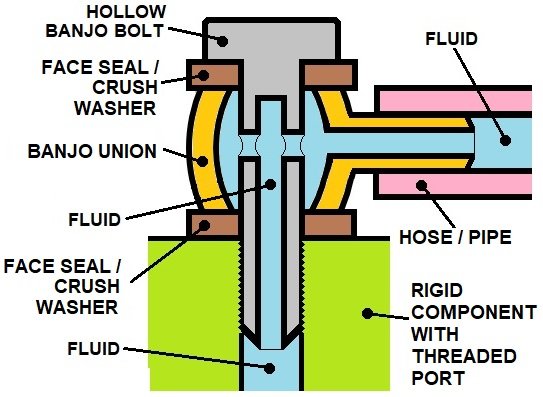
A general schematic, not to scale, showing the fluid path in an assembled banjo fitting.

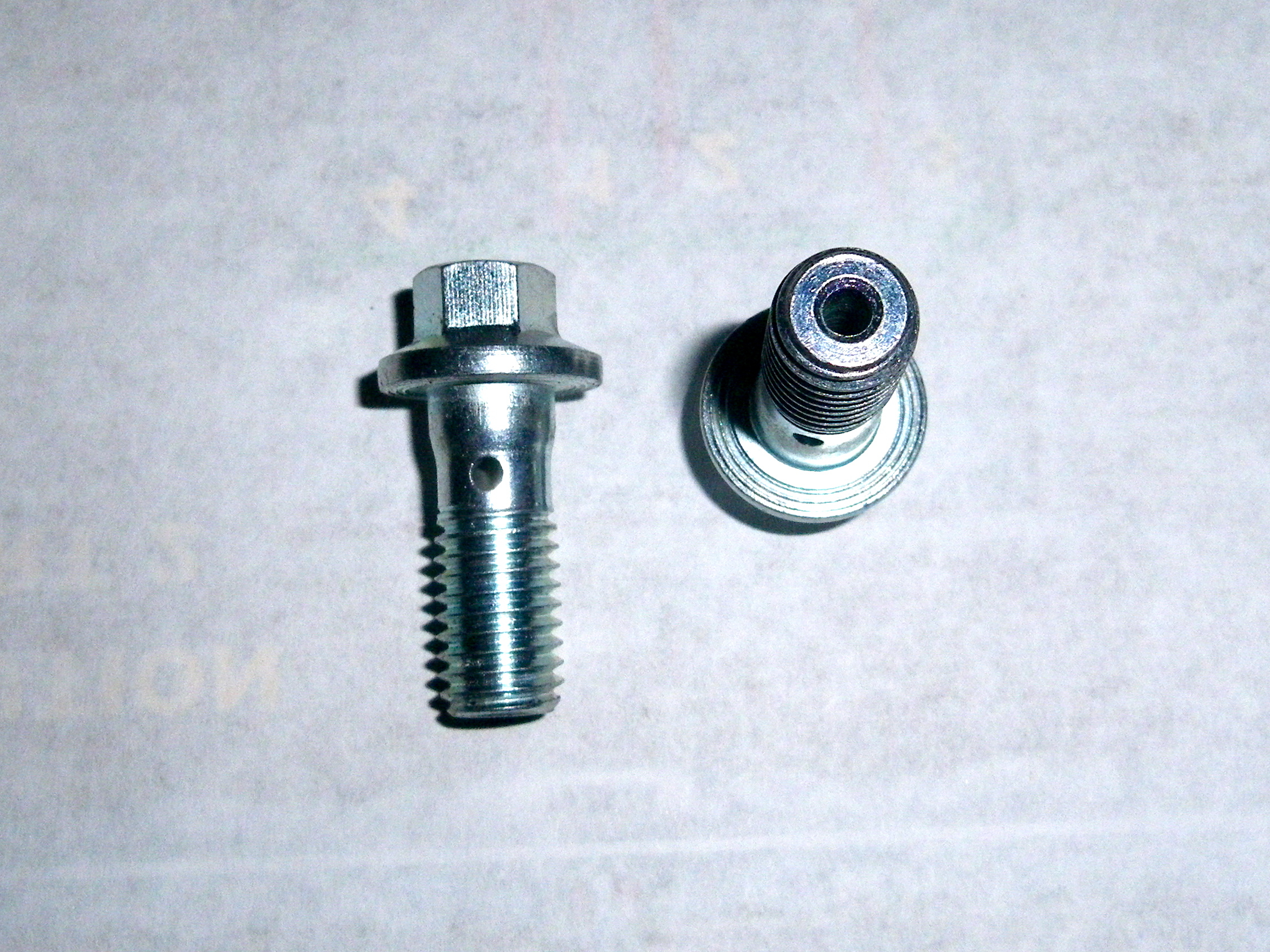
A pair of banjo bolts as used in automotive braking.

A hose connecting bolt, often called a banjo bolt or internally relieved bolt, is a spherical union for fluid transfer. It is typically used to connect a fluid line to a rigid, internally threaded hydraulic component. The bolt is assembled through the center of the union, usually with face seals on either side of the union, to create a fluid path between the external ports on the union and bolt. A flexible hose or a rigid pipe may be connected to the union port.

The main advantage of the fitting is in high pressure applications (i.e. more than 50 bar). The name stems from the shape of the fitting, having a large circular section connected to a thinner pipe, generally similar to the shape of a banjo.

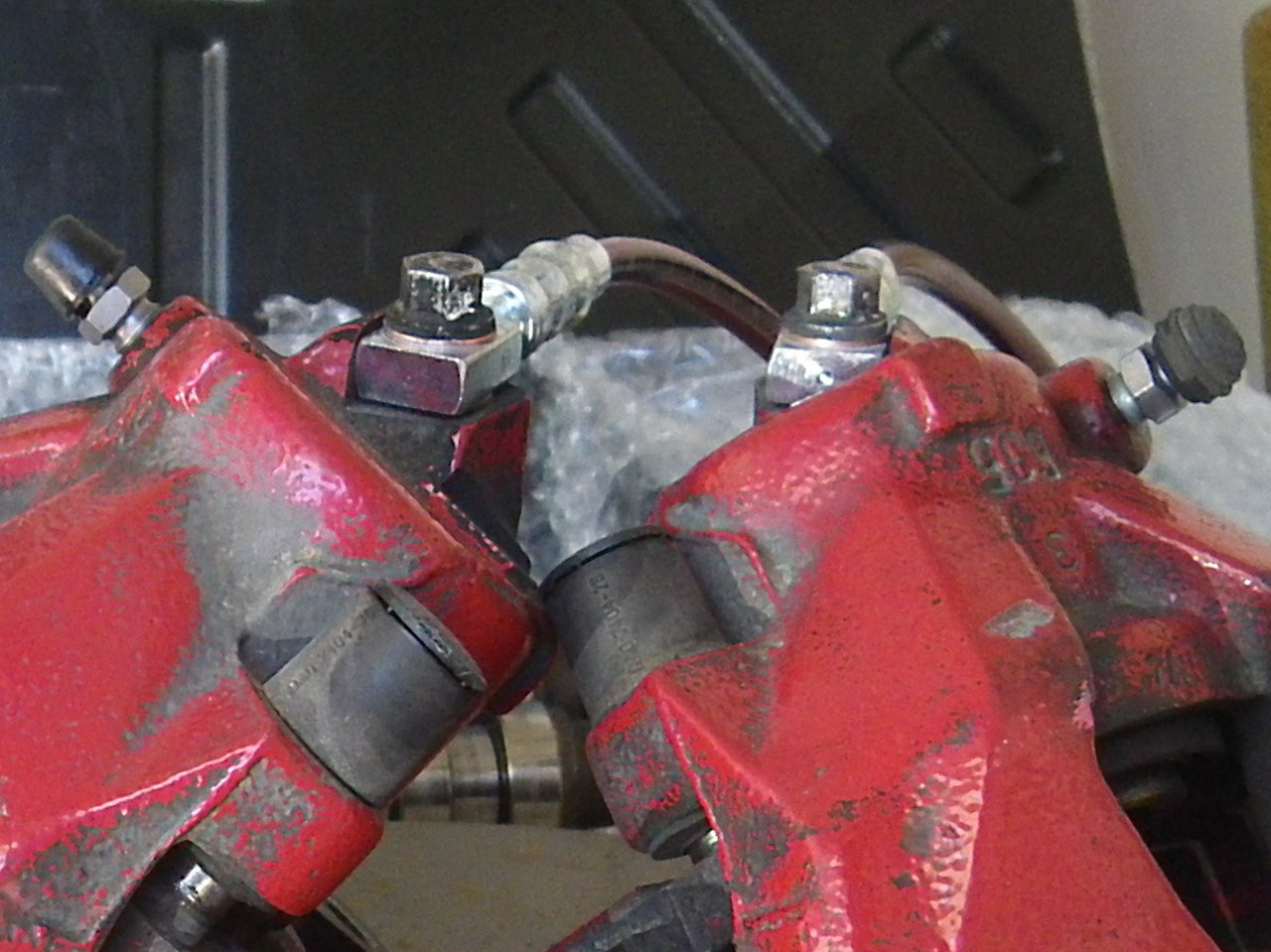
Two banjo fittings (upper center of photo) atop automotive brake calipers. The copper crush washer in the gap between the fitting and body of the caliper completes the seal.

Compared to pipe fittings that are themselves threaded, banjo fittings have the advantage that they do not have to be rotated relative to the host fitting. This avoids damage that can be caused by twisting the hose during installation. It also allows the pipe exit direction to be adjusted relative to the fitting, then the bolt tightened independently.

== Common applications ==
Banjo fittings are commonly found in automotive fuel, motor oil, and hydraulic systems (e.g.: brakes and clutch). General applications include:

- Hydraulic power systems
- Power steering fluid
- Variable valve timing systems
- Brake caliper connectors
- Turbo charger oil feeds
- Fuel filter connectors
- Carburetor connector
- Hydraulic clutch systems
- Fuel dosing for SCR systems
