= Hydraulic clearance =

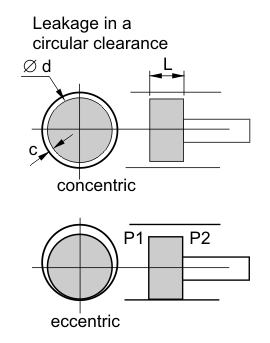
Leakage in narrow clearance, spool valve

Hydraulic clearance. Flow in narrow clearances are of vital importance in hydraulic system component design. The flow in a narrow circular clearance of a spool valve can be calculated according to the formula below if the height is negligible compared to the width of the clearance, such as most of the clearances in hydraulic pumps, hydraulic motors, and spool valves. Flow is considered to be laminar. The formula below is valid for a spool valve when the spool is steady.

Concentric spool/valve housing position i.e. the height/radial clearance c is the same all around: Units as per SI conventions : Flow Q_{i} = (∆P · π · d · c^{3}) ÷ (12 · ν · ρ · L) where:
Q = volumetric flow rate (m^3/sec)
ΔP = P1-P2 = pressure drop over the clearance (N/m^2, Pa)
d = valve spool diameter (metre)
c = clearance height (radial clearance) (metre)
ν = kinematic viscosity for the oil (m^2/sec)
ρ = density for the oil (kg/m^3)
L = clearance length (metre)

As can be seen from the formula, the clearance height c has much more influence on the leakage than the length. The formula clearly hints of pure laminar flow conditions. It is also valid for gases.

Contact between the spool and the wall, the value that is generally used for practical calculations:

Flow Q_{e} = 2.5 · Qi
