= Hydrodynamic coupling =

Hydrodynamic coupling may refer to:

- fluid coupling
- torque converter
