= Denison Hydraulics =

Denison Hydraulics is a publicly traded U.S.-based company (Stock Symbol:DENHY) that manufactures industrial hydraulic fluid power systems (hydraulic pumps, motors, valves and engineered systems) and components and is headquartered in Marysville, Ohio. Denison is owned by Parker Hannifin. Denison has annual revenues of about $180 million, has 1,150 employees in North America, Europe and Asia, and approximately 61 percent of its customer base is in Europe.

== History ==
Denison Hydraulics Inc., originally known as the Cook Motor Co., was founded in 1900 in Delaware, Ohio, as a manufacturer of heavy duty industrial gasoline engines. The main problem was that they were big, heavy, and only single-cylinder. For example, a typical 50 hp engine weighed 3 tons.

After World War I, Mr. Cook wanted to retire. Bill Denison took over just as the engine market was dying. He continued to operate under the original Cook Motor Co. name. In 1925, Mr. Denison invented a hydraulic car pusher. It was designed to slowly move cars full of clay-ware through a kiln - decidedly the newest invention of the day owning over 80% of the hydraulic market. It was the first hydraulic machine.

Shortly after getting the new car pusher developed, there was a business recession. The new art of hydraulics pulled them through. The name HydrOILic was then used to identify this new method of power transmission. Cook Motor Company went into receivership.

Bill Denison was able to reorganize the company as the Denison Engineering Company. The company survived the Depression, although just barely. One of the early products included the Billet Pusher and the "Compact" Power Unit.

In 1933, a fire destroyed the plant in Delaware. The Budd-Ranney Company had property at the corner of Chestnut and Marconi Blvd. Denison operated under contract with Budd-Ranney Engineering until 1935. Denison then acquired Budd-Ranney - which was maintained for a while as a separate subsidiary. Prior to World War II, Denison was contacted to help with developing test stands and presses to assist in making weapons and aircraft. Presses increased production of airplane engine crankshafts by four times. Presses also permitted "safer" manufacturing of high explosive shells.

During the war years, Bill Denison bought facilities throughout Columbus and a research center in Powell, Ohio. One of the properties Denison purchased was a property on Dublin Road which would provide for special military needs. Aircraft test stands permitted testing complete hydraulic systems while on the ground and testing hydraulic operated fuel transfer valves for airplanes. Special vacuum chambers tested spark plugs and magnetos.

Denison had to get with the times. An Engineering division was developed after World War II. In addition to the Multipress, another division was responsible for the manufacture of hydraulic components for the general industry. A separate division was dedicated only to Research and Development. Ideas that were discussed during the "War Years", but shelved, due to lack of time and manpower, now came "off the shelf". Additional controls for the Multipress and many new products for the hydraulic industry were developed. In fact, Denison salesmen had to teach their customers about the merits of hydraulics. In 1945, a new line of high speed, lightweight aircraft pumps were introduced and in 1954, Denison, in cooperation with the U.S. Government, purchased a factory at 425 Sandusky St., Delaware, Ohio.

In addition to other products, the intent was to manufacture aircraft pumps. In 1955, Bill Denison sold his business to American Brake Shoe. He remained president and resided on the Board of Directors. 1956 the aircraft pumps are moved to Rochester, New York and later Oxnard, California. Finally, in April 1962, the business moved to Marysville, OH.

In July 1962, Denison took shape and began to build its present-day factory, building all types of hydraulic pumps. In October 1962, the manufacturing facility in Marysville was completed. Still operating as American Brake Shoe, the facility was initially used for manufacturing piston pumps and providing special products for the government. The Multipress group soon moved in as well. In 1966, American Brake Shoe changed their name and identity to ABEX. In 1968 ABEX merged with Illinois Central Railroad to become IC Industries. Throughout the ABEX and IC years, Denison continued to be a leader in the development of high-performance fluid power products.

American Brake Shoe in Mahwah, New Jersey at or around the time it changed its name to ABEX was working on a 48-track Route Switching System (Hump Yard) for I believe the Santa Fe Railroad. Two versions of the switching unit were created, one in Mahwah and one in Chicago. The Chicago version was a fully transistorized unit that fit on a tabletop; the Mahwah version used stepping relays, dozens of each. Two engineers and one engineering technician {William (Bill) C. McElroy jr} did the design and build of the walk-in closet sized 7 ft (2.1 m) tall unit. The railroad 'bosses' looked at both designs and decided that rather than retrain their personnel to understand transistors, they would rather keep with the relays and thus, purchased our version. There was one minor problem, they wanted the relay closet to be 'portable', and thus we welded a six-inch eye hook to the top of the cabinet housing. That was the day I understood that our nation's railroads were in deep trouble.

Denison, became especially heavily involved with Marine and defense applications providing steering gears and many other products to the US Navy. In 1986, ABEX/IC sold the Denison division to a Swedish manufacturer of Radial Piston Hydraulic Motors, Hagglunds.

As business slowed during the recession of the 1980s, Hagglunds Denison was forced to close and sell several factories. Burgess Hill, England: Delaware, Ohio: and Columbus, Ohio. Marysville then became the Corporate Headquarters but was also subject to severe cutbacks. Denison split into two groups in 1991: Hagglunds Drives and Hagglunds Denison. In 1993, Hagglunds sold the Denison portion to three private investors. Hagglunds remained a customer of Denison, but no longer retained ownership in the company. The company name was then changed to the current Denison Hydraulics Inc.

In October 2003, Parker Hannifin acquired Denison International for $240 million.

== Denison Engineering ==
Based on Bill Denison's hydraulics expertise—the Denison company was to go on to produce more than 600 patents during the twentieth century.

The most prominent engineer was Ellis Born, (October 11, 1919 - Monday, March 19, 2007) graduated in 1941 from the Ohio State University with a Bachelor of Science in mechanical engineering. He was associated with more than 100 patents developed throughout his career. Born received the Ohio State Department of Mechanical Engineering 2006 Charles Kettering Lifetime Achievement Award in recognition of his achievements over his lifetime as a mechanical engineer.
