= Miniature hydraulics =

Miniature Hydraulics are copies or models that represent and reproduce regular or standard sized hydraulic systems and components, but in a reduced state, on a small scale, or in a greatly reduced size. True working and functional miniature hydraulics follow the same operating principles and behavioral properties as their standard or regular size hydraulic prototypes, but are done so primarily at reduced sizes and pressures. Although uncommon, miniature hydraulics do exist, and are obtainable through a variety of sources. Miniature hydraulics, mini hydraulics, and micro hydraulics are abbreviated as or otherwise known as M-H.
