= Inch pedal =

An inch pedal or inching pedal is a pedal used in many models of mobile machinery with a hydraulic pilot pressure output proportional to the pedal position, or an electronic pedal with a proportional electric signal output. The pedal is used in hydrostatic transmissions to temporarily affect the preset characteristics for hydrostatic gear ratio versus diesel engine rpm. It thus allows the operator to "inch forward" or "inch backward" slowly over short distances for fine positioning of the machine. Common applications include forklift trucks (for fine positioning of the truck and hence the forks and the load) and farm tractors (for fine positioning of the tractor when preparing to hitch up to implements).
