= Secondary-controlled hydraulic drive =

Model of secondary-controlled hydraulic drive.

Secondary-controlled hydraulic drive is a type of hydraulic drive in which a variable-displacement hydraulic unit is connected to a pressure-controlled hydraulic network. The unit can operate as either a hydraulic motor or a hydraulic pump, allowing energy to flow in both directions.

== System components ==
The system mainly consists of a constant-pressure hydraulic power supply, a secondary hydraulic unit, a check valve, a mechanical load, an electrohydraulic servo valve, a variable-displacement piston, and various safety and auxiliary components.

The constant-pressure hydraulic power supply provides stable hydraulic pressure and hydraulic flow for the system. The secondary hydraulic unit is the core energy-conversion component and can switch between hydraulic motor mode and hydraulic pump mode under different operating conditions. The check valves control the direction of hydraulic fluid flow and prevent reverse flow. The mechanical load can either be driven by the secondary unit or transmit mechanical energy back to it under certain operating conditions.

The servo valve adjusts the position of the variable-displacement piston according to the control signal, thereby changing the displacement of the secondary unit and regulating its output torque, rotational speed, and operating mode. In addition, safety and auxiliary components, such as pressure relief valves, pressure sensors, filters, and accumulators, are installed to ensure stable, reliable, and safe operation of the entire hydraulic system.

== Operating modes ==
Four quadrant principle.

A secondary unit operates according to the four quadrant principle, corresponding to four operating modes:

1. First quadrant: Both the torque and rotational speed of the secondary unit are positive, and the unit operates as a hydraulic motor.
2. Second quadrant: The torque is positive while the rotational speed is negative, and the unit operates as a hydraulic pump.
3. Third quadrant: Both the torque and rotational speed are negative, and the unit operates as a hydraulic motor.
4. Fourth quadrant: The torque is negative while the rotational speed is positive, and the unit operates as a hydraulic pump.

== Applications ==
Secondary controlled drive is mainly used in hydraulic systems where the load changes significantly, the direction of motion changes frequently, and energy recovery is required. Common applications include excavator swing systems, crane and winch drives, active heave compensation systems on ships, and other construction and industrial hydraulic equipment.

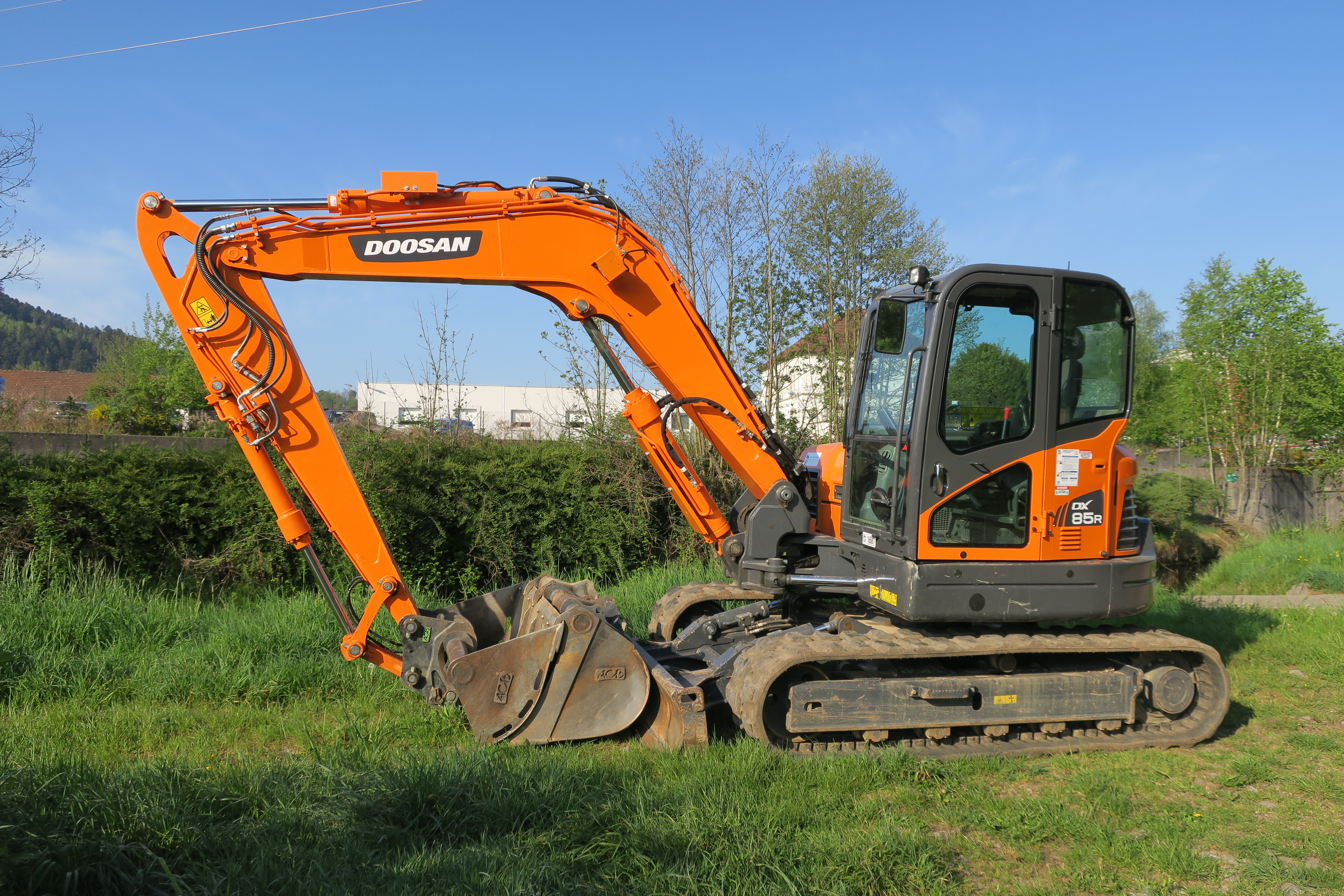
Hydraulic excavator.

In hydraulic excavators, the upper structure repeatedly starts, accelerates, and brakes during swing operation. Because a secondary unit can operate in all four quadrants, it can switch between motor mode and pump mode according to the operating condition. During starting and acceleration, it converts hydraulic energy into mechanical energy to drive the swing platform. During braking, it converts part of the rotational kinetic energy back into hydraulic energy, which can be returned to the constant-pressure hydraulic supply or stored in an accumulator. This helps reduce energy losses.

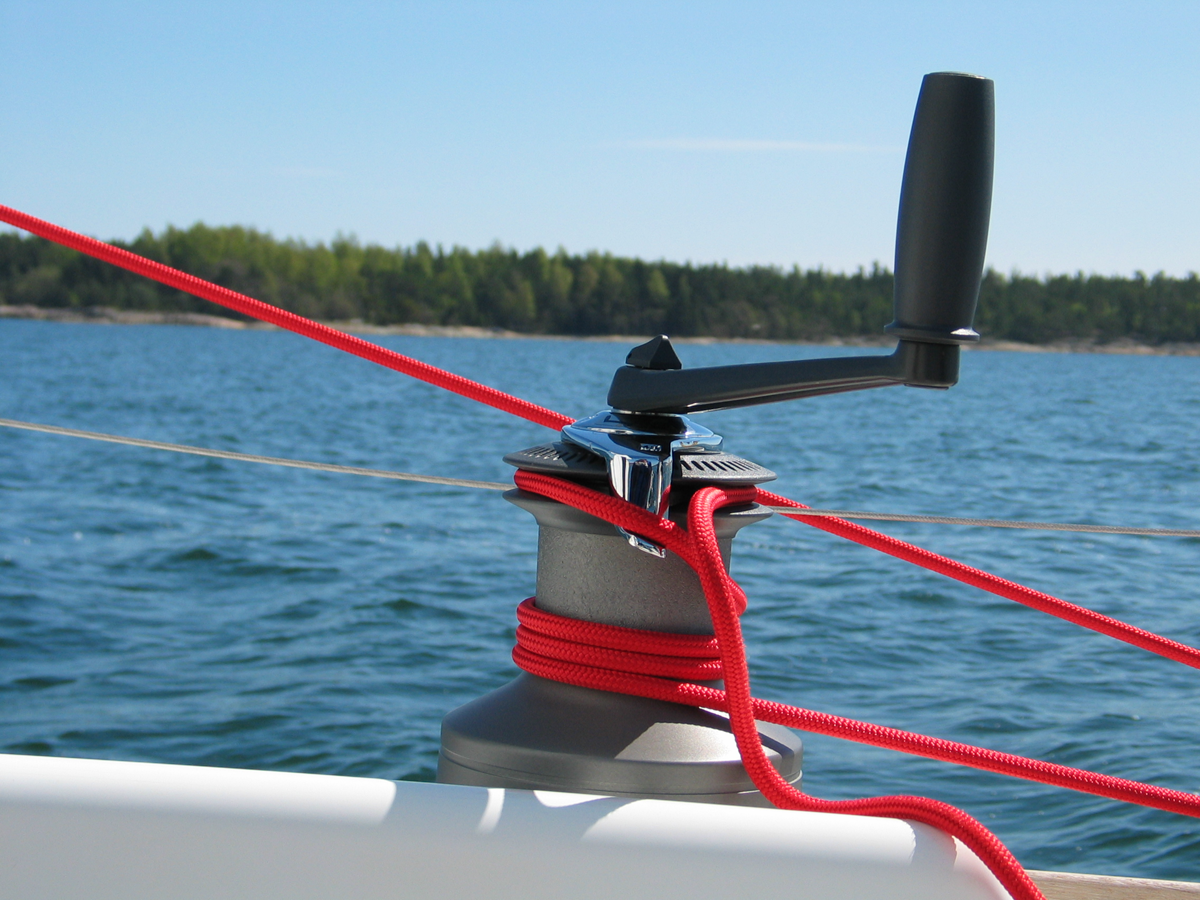
Winch system.

In crane and winch systems, secondary controlled drive can be used to control the lifting, lowering, and braking of heavy loads. When a load is lifted, the secondary unit operates as a motor and drives the winch drum. When the load is lowered, the gravitational potential energy of the load drives the secondary unit, causing it to operate as a pump. Part of this energy can then be recovered and returned to the hydraulic system.

Secondary controlled drive can also be used in active heave compensation systems on ships. These systems control the winding and unwinding of a winch cable according to the vertical motion of the vessel, helping to reduce the movement of a suspended load. Since the secondary unit can switch between forward rotation, reverse rotation, driving, and braking, it can adapt to the changing motion conditions of offshore operations and recover part of the energy generated during repeated movement.

In general, secondary controlled drive offers relatively fast response, a wide speed-control range, four-quadrant operation, and the ability to recover load energy. It is therefore suitable for hydraulic systems involving periodic motion, frequent starting and stopping, and large inertial loads.

== Advantages and limitations ==
One of the main advantages of secondary controlled drive is that it can work under changing loads, changing directions of motion, and operating conditions that switch frequently. Compared with a conventional fixed-displacement hydraulic system, a secondary unit can change its displacement according to the load and control requirements. A smaller displacement can be used for a light load, while a larger displacement can be used for a heavy load. This allows the output torque and speed to better match the actual operating conditions and helps reduce unnecessary energy losses.

A secondary unit can also switch between pump mode and motor mode. When the system needs to drive a load, the unit usually operates as a motor and converts hydraulic energy into mechanical energy. When the load drives the unit, or when the system is braking, the unit can switch to pump mode and convert mechanical energy back into hydraulic energy. If the system includes an accumulator, this recovered hydraulic energy can be stored and reused later.

The main disadvantage of secondary controlled drive is that the system and its control method are relatively complex. The displacement of the secondary unit must be adjusted continuously according to changes in load, speed, and pressure. The unit must also switch smoothly between pump and motor modes. When the displacement is close to zero, or when the operating mode changes, the output torque and the direction of oil flow may change. This can lead to unstable operation near the zero-displacement point, pressure fluctuations, or reduced control accuracy. For this reason, secondary controlled drives usually require reliable sensors, suitable control methods, and additional measures to improve system stability.

== See also ==
- Hydraulic machinery
- Electro-hydraulic actuator
- Hydraulic cylinder
- Hydraulic ram
