= Shuttle valve =

Valve which allows fluid to flow through it from one of two sources

Shuttle valve symbol

Shuttle valve action principle cross section

A shuttle valve is a type of valve which allows fluid to flow through it from one of two sources. Generally a shuttle valve is used in pneumatic systems, although sometimes it will be found in hydraulic systems.

== Structure and function ==
The basic structure of a shuttle valve is like a tube with three openings; one on each end, and one in the middle. A ball or other blocking valve element (the shuttle) moves freely within the tube. When pressure of a fluid is exerted through the opening at one end it pushes the shuttle towards the opposite end, closing it. This prevents the fluid from passing through that opening, but allows it to flow out through the middle opening. In this way two different sources can provide pressure to a device without the threat of back flow from one source to the other.

In pneumatic logic a shuttle-valve works as an OR gate.

== Applications ==
A shuttle valve has several applications including:

- The use of more switches on one machine: by using the shuttle valve, more than one switch can be operated on a single machine for safety, and each switch can be placed at any suitable location. This application is normally used with heavy industrial machinery.
- Winch brake circuit: a shuttle valve provides brake control in pneumatic winch applications. When the compressor is operated the shuttle valves direct air to open the brake shoes. When the control valve is centered, the brake cylinder is vented through the shuttle valve, and the brake shoes are allowed to close.
- Air pilot control: converting from air to oil results in locking of the cylinder. Shifting the four-way valve to either extreme position applies the air pilot through the shuttle valve, holding the two air-operated valves open and applying oil under air pressure to the corresponding side of the cylinder. Positioning a manual valve to neutral exhausts the air pilot pressure, closing the two-way valves, and trapping oil on both sides of the cylinder to lock it in position.
- Standby and emergency systems: compressor systems requiring standby or purge gases capability are pressure controlled by the shuttle valve. This is used for instrumentation, pressure cables, or any system requiring continuous pneumatic input. If the compressor fails, the standby tank—regulated to slightly under the compressor supply—will shift the shuttle valve and take over the function. When the compressor pressure is re-established, the shuttle valve shifts back and seals off the standby system until needed again.
