= Giuseppe Ceredi =

16th-century Italian hydraulic engineer, physician, mathematician, and mechanician

Giuseppe Ceredi was a 16th‑century Italian hydraulic engineer, physician, pharmacist, and mathematician whose work played a significant role in the evolution of hydraulic science during the Renaissance. Best known for his 1567 treatise, Tre discorsi sopra il modo d'alzar acque da' luoghi bassi, Ceredi advanced the design and application of water‑lifting machines—most notably the Archimedes screw (also known as the cochlea)—and proposed systematic irrigation schemes that integrated theoretical, practical, and economic considerations.

== Biography ==
Very little was known about Ceredi’s life until recent scholarly investigations shed light on his multidisciplinary background. According to a brief entry in the Dizionario biografico piacentino (1899), Ceredi was a skilled pharmacist, physician, and mathematician, who perfected Vitruvius’s cochlea, reflecting his expertise in refining ancient hydraulic technology. He was a student and close friend of Benedetto Labadini, a prominent professor at the time, and is known to have visited Giorgio Valla’s private library, where he encountered rare writings by Hero, Pappus, and Dionysodorus that influenced his understanding of hydraulic science.

Ceredi received a patent from Ottavio Farnese for the development of his machines in 1566.

== Major work ==
In 1567, Ceredi published his seminal work, Tre discorsi sopra il modo d'alzar acque da' luoghi bassi. The treatise is richly illustrated with woodcut images—including a title vignette, internal illustrations, and folding plates—which serve not only depict the machinery but also serve as visual proofs of his mechanical innovations. This work represents one of the few detailed Renaissance documents to explain the inner workings of hydraulic machines at a time when most technical knowledge was transmitted only through drawings or fragmentary descriptions.

== Contributions to hydraulic engineering ==
=== Improvements to the Archimedes screw ===
Ceredi is best known for his enhancements to the Archimedes screw—a device originally invented in the 3rd century BC. At a time when detailed construction guidelines for the device were lost, he provided a systematic approach to its design and operation. By refining construction details such as the geometry of the helical surface and the configuration of the drive lever (including experimental evaluations of both straight and curved lever designs), he improved its efficiency and reliability. His work represents one of the earliest documented proposals for using a standardized mechanical device for irrigation and water management.

=== Development of systematic irrigation schemes ===
Ceredi’s treatise went beyond mere mechanical design and addressed broader issues of hydraulic science. He discussed the application of hydraulic machines for tasks such as irrigating agricultural land, removing excess spring and rainwater from fields lacking natural drainage, supplying drinking water to urban centers, and for military applications, such as obtaining water for armies. His analysis included economic evaluations, maintenance considerations, and even cost–benefit calculations—underscoring Ceredi's grasp of the practical importance of hydraulic engineering. His experimental approach, which involved repeated testing and empirical verification of the machines’ performance, highlighted his commitment to ensuring that theoretical models were effectively translated into practical applications.

=== Philosophical and epistemological context ===
Influenced by the Philosophia Naturalis model and Thales of Miletus, Ceredi viewed hydraulic machines as the tangible manifestation of mathematical and physical laws. He argued that the “beautiful mathematical arguments” underlying natural phenomena must be matched by precise “hands-on” engineering practices. This epistemological stance positioned him as a pioneer among 16th‑century inventors, bridging the gap between ancient technical traditions and emerging scientific thought during the early phases of the Scientific Revolution.

== Legacy ==
Once an obscure figure, recent scholarship has reappraised Ceredi as a key contributor to hydraulic engineering in Renaissance Italy. His integration of multidisciplinary knowledge—from medicine and mathematics to practical engineering—helped lay the groundwork for later developments in water management. After Ceredi developed and patented his improved Archimedean screw design, these pumps spread throughout Southern Europe for drainage and irrigation. Galileo later refined the technology further, securing a patent for a horse-powered water-raising mechanism. Ceredi’s work not only influenced subsequent debates on hydraulic efficiency but also provided a model for how theoretical insights could be applied to solve practical, everyday problems, thereby improving public health, agriculture, and military logistics.

Despite this, Ceredi would fall into obscurity over the following centuries, leading Giovanni Aldini to lament how the innovative mechanisms of the 16th century, including those proposed by Ceredi, had largely fallen into disuse.

== See also ==
- Benedetto Castelli
