= Hydraulic motor =

Machine converting flow into rotation

Hydraulic gear motor

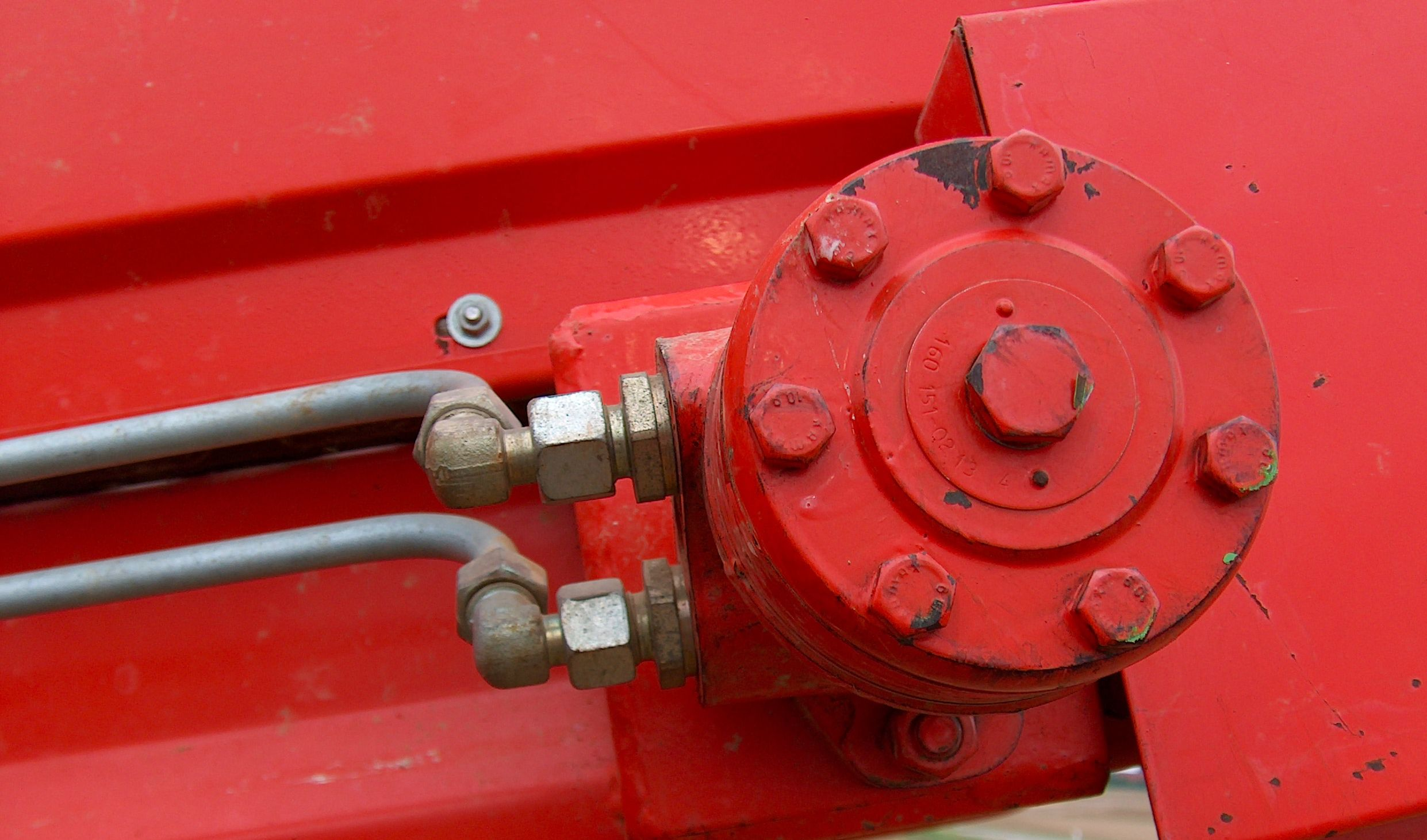
A small hydraulic motor

Symbol: hydraulic motor

A hydraulic motor is a mechanical actuator that converts hydraulic pressure and flow into torque and angular displacement (rotation). The hydraulic motor is the rotary counterpart of the hydraulic cylinder as a linear actuator. Most broadly, the category of devices called hydraulic motors has sometimes included those that run on hydropower (namely, water engines and water motors) but in today's terminology the name usually refers more specifically to motors that use hydraulic fluid as part of closed hydraulic circuits in modern hydraulic machinery.

Conceptually, a hydraulic motor should be interchangeable with a hydraulic pump because it performs the opposite function – similar to the way a DC electric motor is theoretically interchangeable with a DC electrical generator. However, many hydraulic pumps cannot be used as hydraulic motors because they cannot be backdriven. Also, a hydraulic motor is usually designed for working pressure at both sides of the motor, whereas most hydraulic pumps rely on low pressure provided from the reservoir at the input side and would leak fluid when abused as a motor.

== History of hydraulic motors ==
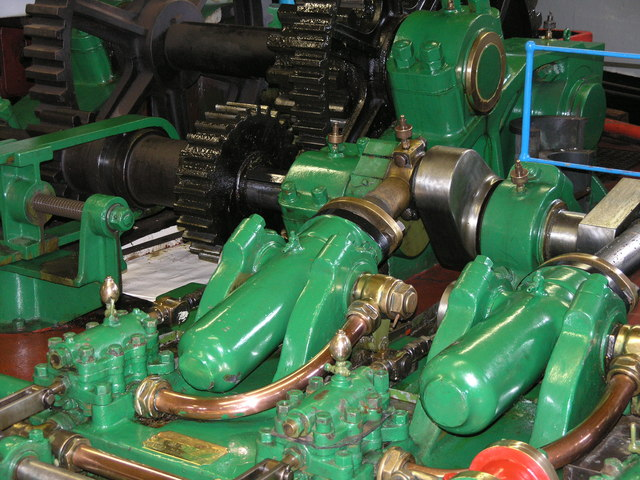
Hydraulic machinery of Swing Bridge, River Tyne

One of the first rotary hydraulic motors to be developed was that constructed by William Armstrong for his Swing Bridge over the River Tyne. Two motors were provided, for reliability. Each one was a three-cylinder single-acting oscillating engine. Armstrong developed a wide range of hydraulic motors, linear and rotary, that were used for a wide range of industrial and civil engineering tasks, particularly for docks and moving bridges.

The first simple fixed-stroke hydraulic motors had the disadvantage that they used the same volume of water whatever the load and so were wasteful at part-power. Unlike steam engines, as water is incompressible, they could not be throttled or their valve cut-off controlled. To overcome this, motors with variable stroke were developed. Adjusting the stroke, rather than controlling admission valves, now controlled the engine power and water consumption. One of the first of these was Arthur Rigg's patent engine of 1886. This used a double eccentric mechanism, as used on variable stroke power presses, to control the stroke length of a three cylinder radial engine. Later, the swashplate engine with an adjustable swashplate angle would become a popular way to make variable stroke hydraulic motors.

== Types ==
=== Vane motors ===
Vane motor

A vane motor consists of a housing with an eccentric bore, in which runs a rotor with vanes in it that slide in and out. The force differential created by the unbalanced force of the pressurized fluid on the vanes causes the rotor to spin in one direction. A critical element in vane motor design is how the vane tips are machined at the contact point between vane tip and motor housing. Several types of "lip" designs are used, and the main objective is to provide a tight seal between the inside of the motor housing and the vane, and at the same time to minimize wear and metal-to-metal contact.

=== Gear motors ===
Gear motor

A gear motor (external gear) consists of two gears, the driven gear (attached to the output shaft by way of a key, etc.) and the idler gear. High pressure oil is ported into one side of the gears, where it flows around the periphery of the gears, between the gear tips and the wall housings in which it resides, to the outlet port. The gears mesh, not allowing the oil from the outlet side to flow back to the inlet side. For lubrication, the gear motor uses a small amount of oil from the pressurized side of the gears, bleeds this through the (typically) hydrodynamic bearings, and vents the same oil either to the low pressure side of the gears, or through a dedicated drain port on the motor housing, which is usually connected to a line that vents the motor's case pressure to the system's reservoir. An especially positive attribute of the gear motor is that catastrophic breakdown is less common than in most other types of hydraulic motors. This is because the gears gradually wear down the housing and/or main bushings, reducing the volumetric efficiency of the motor gradually until it is all but useless. This often happens long before wear causes the unit to seize or break down.

Gear motors can be supplied as single or double-directional based on their usage, and they are preferred in either aluminum or cast iron bodies, depending on application conditions. They offer design options that can handle radial loads. Additionally, alternative configurations include pressure relief valve, anti-cavitation valve, and speed sensor to meet specific application needs.

=== Gerotor motors ===
Gerotor motor

The gerotor motor is in essence a rotor with n − 1 teeth, rotating off center in a rotor/stator with n teeth. Pressurized fluid is guided into the assembly using a (usually) axially placed plate-type distributor valve. Several different designs exist, such as the Geroller (internal or external rollers) and Nichols motors. Typically, the Gerotor motors are low-to-medium speed and medium-to-high torque.

=== Axial plunger motors ===
For high quality rotating drive systems, plunger motors are generally used. Whereas the speed of hydraulic pumps range from 1200 to 1800 rpm, the machinery to be driven by the motor often requires a much lower speed. This means that when an axial plunger motor (swept volume maximum 2 litres) is used, a gearbox is usually needed. For a continuously adjustable swept volume, axial piston motors are used. Like piston (reciprocating) type pumps, the most common design of the piston type of motor is the axial. This type of motor is the most commonly used in hydraulic systems. These motors are, like their pump counterparts, available in both variable and fixed displacement designs. Typical usable (within acceptable efficiency) rotational speeds range from below 50 rpm to above 14000 rpm. Efficiencies and minimum/maximum rotational speeds are highly dependent on the design of the rotating group, and many different types are in use.

=== Radial piston motors ===
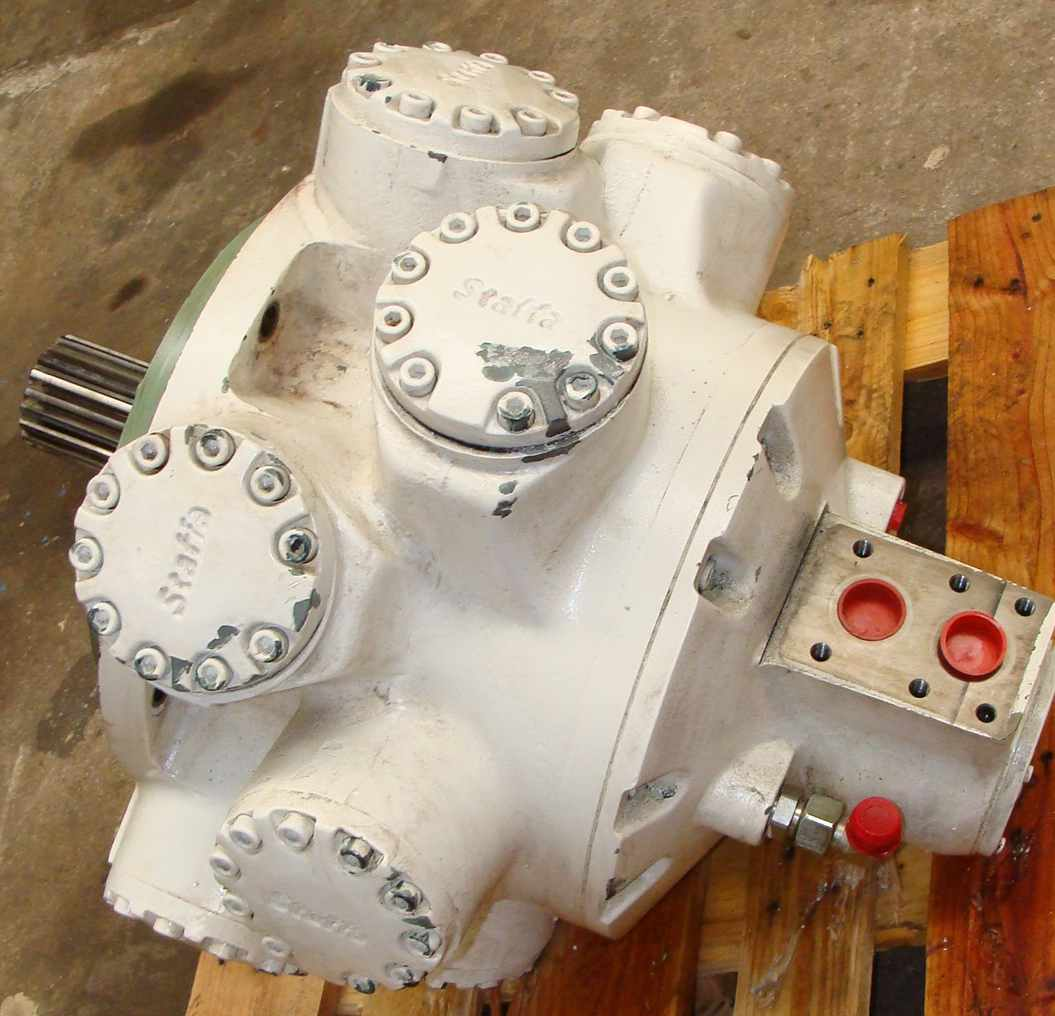
Staffa hydraulic motor

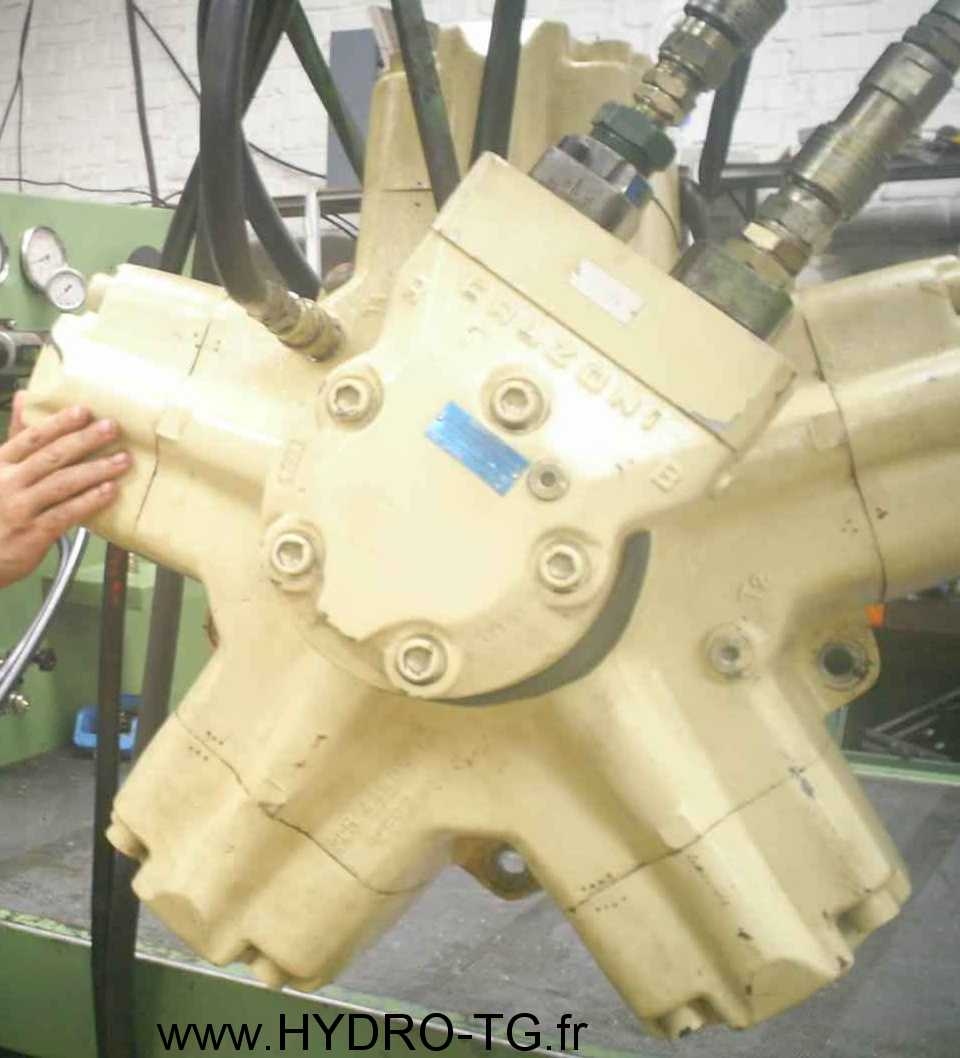
Calzoni hydraulic motor

Radial piston motors are available in two basic types: Pistons pushing inward, and pistons pushing outward.

The crankshaft type (e.g. Staffa or SAI hydraulic motors) with a single cam and the pistons pushing inwards is basically an old design but is one which has extremely high starting torque characteristics. They are available in displacements from 40 cc/rev up to about 50 litres/rev but can sometimes be limited in power output. Crankshaft type radial piston motors are capable of running at "creep" speeds and some can run seamlessly up to 1500 rpm whilst offering virtually constant output torque characteristics. This makes them still the most versatile design. The single-cam-type radial piston motor exists in many different designs itself. Usually the difference lies in the way the fluid is distributed to the different pistons or cylinders, and also the design of the cylinders themselves. Some motors have pistons attached to the cam using rods (much like in an internal combustion engine), while others employ floating "shoes", and even spherical contact telescopic cylinders like the Parker Denison Calzoni type. Each design has its own set of pros and cons, such as freewheeling ability, high volumetric efficiency, high reliability and so on.

Multi-lobe cam ring types (e.g. Black Bruin, Rexroth, Hägglunds Drives, Poclain, Rotary Power or Eaton Hydre-MAC type) have a cam ring with multiple lobes and the piston rollers push outward against the cam ring. This produces a very smooth output with high starting torque but they are often limited in the upper speed range. This type of motor is available in a very wide range from about 1 litre/rev to 250 litres/rev. These motors are particularly good on low speed applications and can develop very high power.

== Braking ==
Hydraulic motors usually have a drain connection for the internal leakage, which means that when the power unit is turned off the hydraulic motor in the drive system will move slowly if an external load is acting on it. Thus, for applications such as a crane or winch with suspended load, there is always a need for a brake or a locking device.

== Uses ==
Hydraulic pumps, motors, and cylinders can be combined into hydraulic drive systems. One or more hydraulic pumps, coupled to one or more hydraulic motors, constitute a hydraulic transmission.

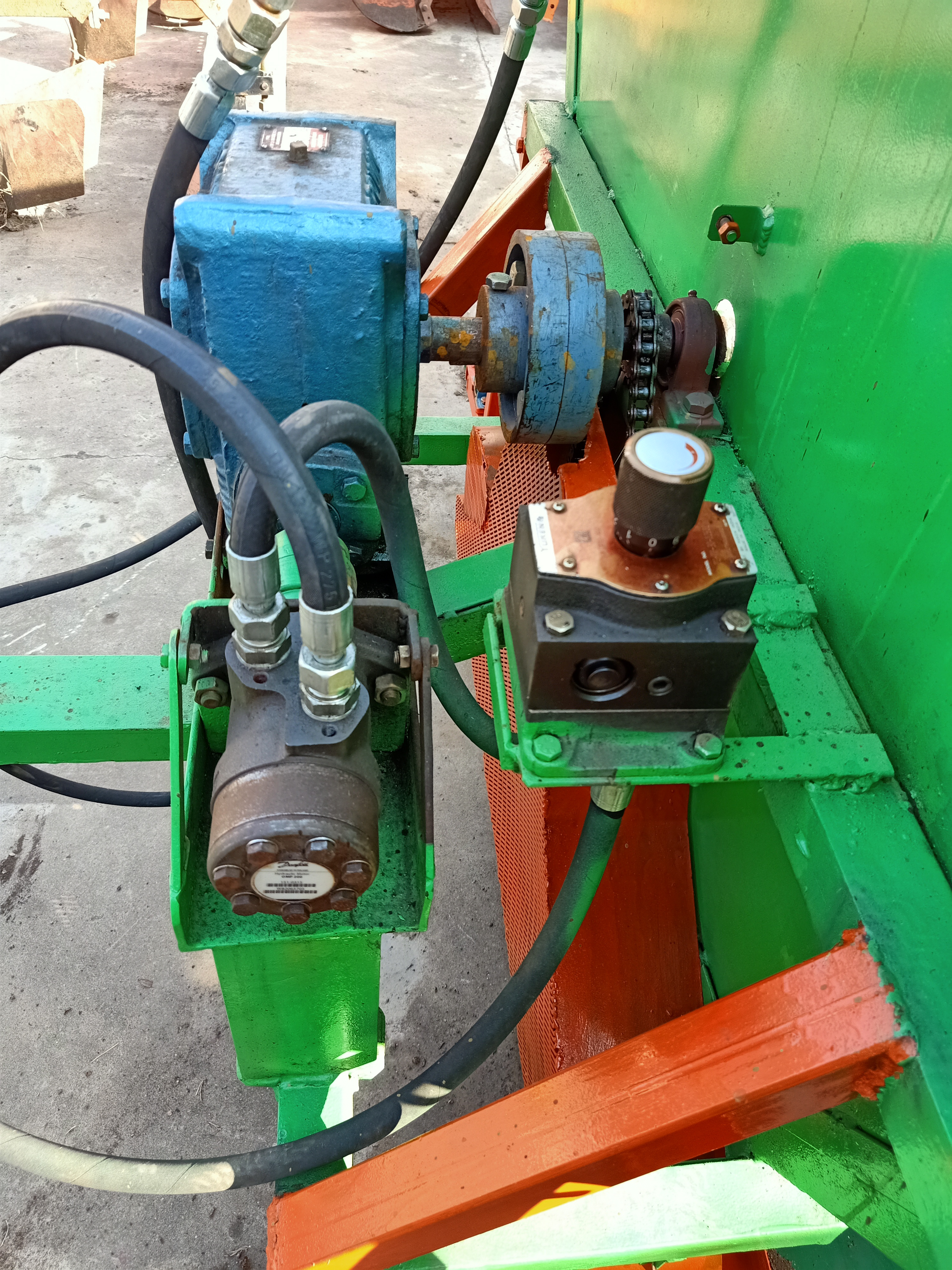
Hydraulic motor and flow controller

Hydraulic motors are used for many applications now such as winches and crane drives, wheel motors for military vehicles, self-driven cranes, excavators, conveyor and feeder drives, cooling fan drives, mixer and agitator drives, roll mills, drum drives for digesters, trommels and kilns, shredders, drilling rigs, trench cutters, high-powered lawn trimmers, and plastic injection machines. Hydraulic motors are also used in heat transfer applications.

== See also ==
- Sisu Nemo
