= Face seal =

Mechanical seal whose surfaces are normal to the sealing axis

A gasket (orange) used as a face seal to prevent flow from escaping from a pipe flange joint

In mechanical engineering, a face seal is a seal in which the sealing surfaces are normal to the axis of the seal. Face seals are typically used in static applications and are used to prevent leakage in the radial direction with respect to the axis of the seal. Face seals are often located in a groove or cavity on a flange. Face seals are a category of products where there is no dynamic movement on the part of either the seal or the hardware surface.

ISO 8434 specifies the general and dimensional requirements for the design and performance of O-ring face seal connectors made of steel for tube outside diameters or hose inside diameters of 6 mm through 38 mm, inclusive. These connectors are for use in fluid power and general applications where elastomeric seals can be used to prevent fluid leakage, including leakage caused by variations in assembly procedures. They are intended for the connection of tubes and hose fittings to ports in accordance with ISO 6149-1.

== Types of face seals ==
- O-rings
- E rings
- C rings
- Gaskets
- End face mechanical seal
