= Hydraulics =

Applied engineering involving liquids

Hydraulics and other studies

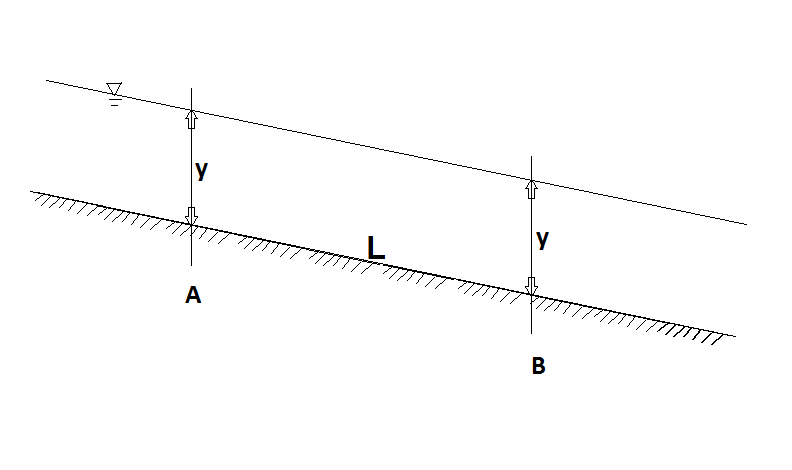
An open channel, with a uniform depth. Open-channel hydraulics

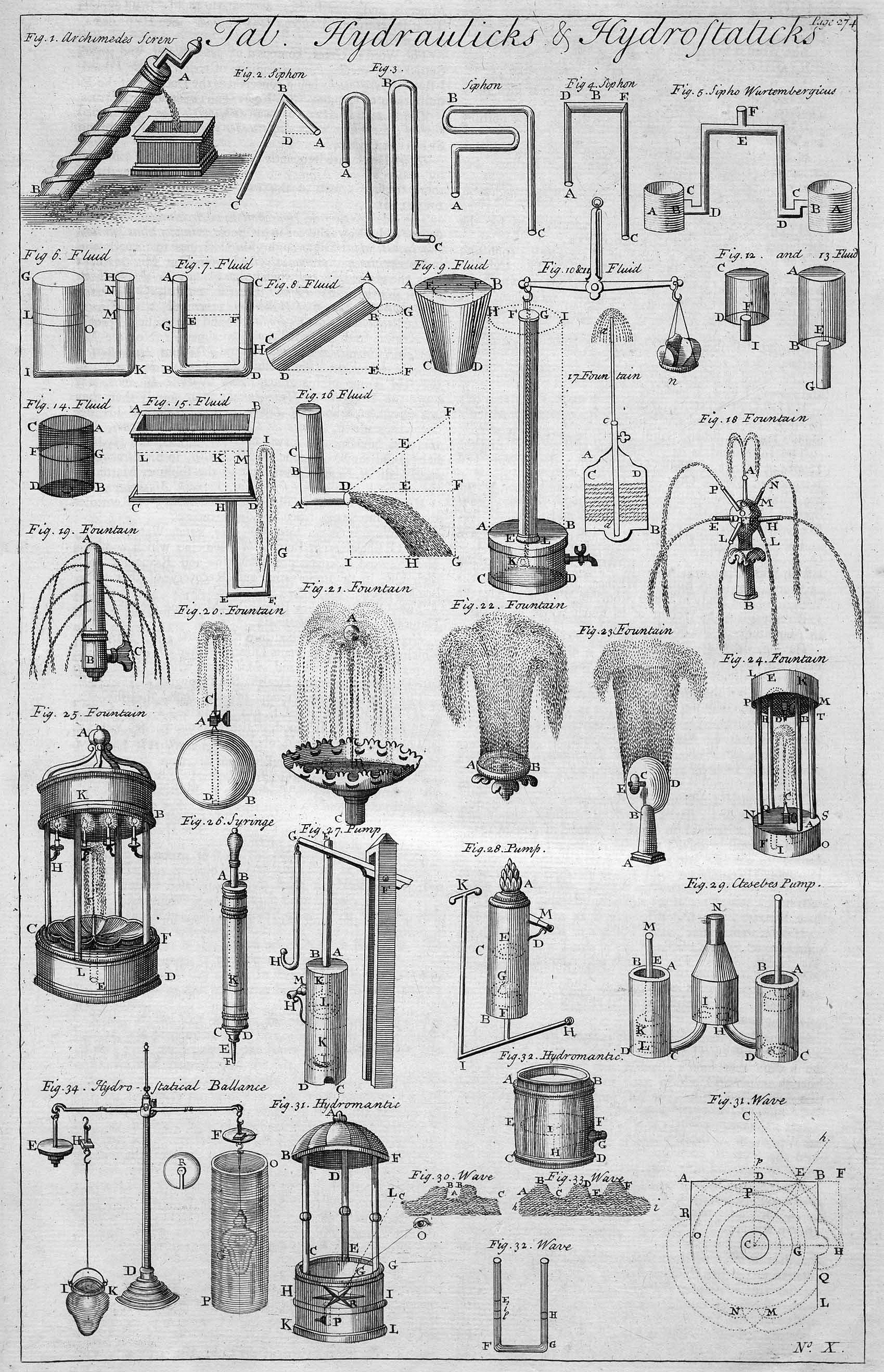
Illustration of hydraulic and hydrostatic, from the "Table of Hydraulics and Hydrostatics", from Cyclopædia, or an Universal Dictionary of Arts and Sciences, edited by Ephraim Chambers, 1728, Vol. 1

Hydraulics (from Ancient Greek ὕδωρ (húdōr) 'water' and αὐλός (aulós) 'pipe') is a technology and applied science using engineering, chemistry, and other sciences involving the mechanical properties and use of liquids.

Rooted in fluid mechanics, hydraulics is used to govern the use of energy via pressurized liquids. It has been part of human history since ancient times. Hydraulic topics range through some parts of science and most engineering modules.

Free surface hydraulics is the branch of hydraulics dealing with free surface flow, such as occurring in rivers, canals, lakes, estuaries and seas. Its sub-field, open-channel flow, studies the flow in open channels.

== Overview ==
Fluid mechanics provides the theoretical foundation for hydraulics, which focuses on applied engineering using the properties of fluids. In its fluid power applications, hydraulics is used for the generation, control, and transmission of power by the use of pressurized liquids. Hydraulic topics range through some parts of science and most of engineering modules, and they cover concepts such as pipe flow, dam design, fluidics, and fluid control circuitry. The principles of hydraulics are naturally in use in the human body within the vascular system and erectile tissue.

Free surface hydraulics is the branch of hydraulics dealing with free surface flow, such as occurring in rivers, canals, lakes, estuaries, and seas. Its sub-field open-channel flow studies the flow in open channels.

At a very basic level, hydraulics is the liquid counterpart of pneumatics, which concerns gases.

== Early history ==
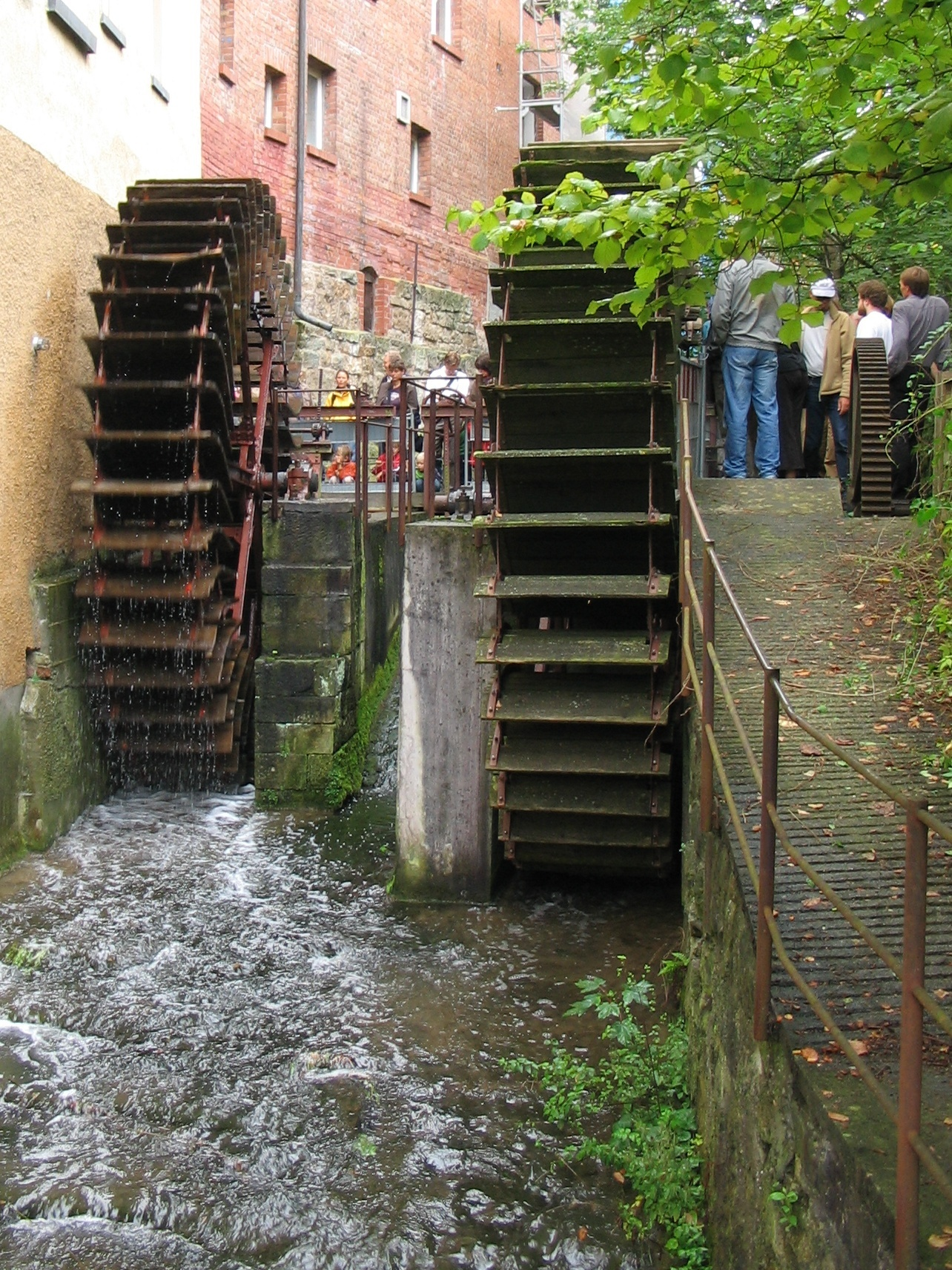
Waterwheels

Early uses of water power date back to Mesopotamia and ancient Egypt, where irrigation has been used since the 6th millennium BC and water clocks have been used since the early 2nd millennium BC. Other early examples of water power include the Qanat system in ancient Persia, the Turpan water system in ancient Central Asia, and the Piedras Bolas aqueduct in ancient Mexico.

=== Maya ===
The Maya at Palenque (in modern-day Chiapas, Mexico) engineered the first known pressurized water system in the Americas. By constructing a subterranean aqueduct (the Piedras Bolas aqueduct) that narrowed significantly at the downstream end, they utilized hydraulic principles to create water pressure capable of shooting water upwards to a height of 6 meters (20 ft). This system was likely used for fountains or sanitary purposes, operating without the need for mechanical pumps.

=== Persian Empire and Urartu ===
In the Persian Empire or previous entities in Persia, the Persians constructed an intricate system of water mills, canals and dams known as the Shushtar Historical Hydraulic System. The project, commenced by Achaemenid king Darius the Great and finished by a group of Roman engineers captured by Sassanian king Shapur I, has been referred to by UNESCO as "a masterpiece of creative genius". They were also the inventors of the Qanat, an underground aqueduct, around the 9th century BC. Several of Iran's large, ancient gardens were irrigated thanks to Qanats.

The Qanat spread to neighboring areas, including the Armenian highlands. There, starting in the early 8th century BC, the Kingdom of Urartu undertook significant hydraulic works, such as the Menua canal.

The earliest evidence of water wheels and watermills dates back to the ancient Near East in the 4th century BC, specifically in the Persian Empire before 350 BC in the regions of Iraq, Iran, and Egypt.

=== China ===
In ancient China there were Sunshu Ao (6th century BC), Ximen Bao (5th century BC), Du Shi (circa 31 AD), Zhang Heng (78 – 139 AD), and Ma Jun (200 – 265 AD), while medieval China had Su Song (1020 – 1101 AD) and Shen Kuo (1031–1095). Du Shi employed a waterwheel to power the bellows of a blast furnace producing cast iron. Zhang Heng was the first to employ hydraulics to provide motive power in rotating an armillary sphere for astronomical observation.

=== Sri Lanka ===
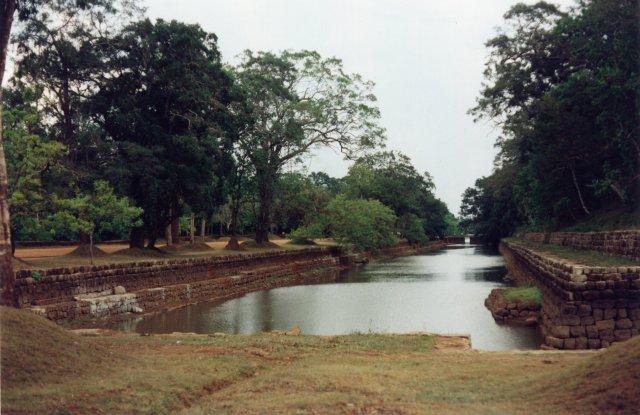
Moat and gardens at Sigiriya

In ancient Sri Lanka, hydraulics were widely used in the ancient kingdoms of Anuradhapura and Polonnaruwa. The discovery of the principle of the valve tower, or valve pit, (Bisokotuwa in Sinhalese) for regulating the escape of water is credited to ingenuity more than 2,000 years ago. By the first century AD, several large-scale irrigation works had been completed. Macro- and micro-hydraulics to provide for domestic horticultural and agricultural needs, surface drainage and erosion control, ornamental and recreational water courses and retaining structures and also cooling systems were in place in Sigiriya, Sri Lanka. The citadel on the massive rock at the site includes cisterns for collecting water. Large ancient reservoirs of Sri Lanka are Kalawewa (King Dhatusena), Parakrama Samudra (King Parakrama Bahu), Tisa Wewa (King Dutugamunu), and Minneriya (King Mahasen).

=== Greco-Roman world ===
In Ancient Greece, the Greeks constructed sophisticated water and hydraulic power systems. An example is a construction by Eupalinos, under a public contract, of a watering channel for Samos, the Tunnel of Eupalinos. An early example of the usage of a hydraulic wheel, likely the earliest in Europe, is the Perachora wheel (3rd century BC).

In Greco-Roman Egypt, the construction of the first hydraulic machine automata by Ctesibius (flourished c. 270 BC) and Hero of Alexandria (c. 10 – 80 AD) is notable. Hero describes several working machines using hydraulic power, such as the force pump, which is known from many Roman sites as having been used for raising water and in fire engines.

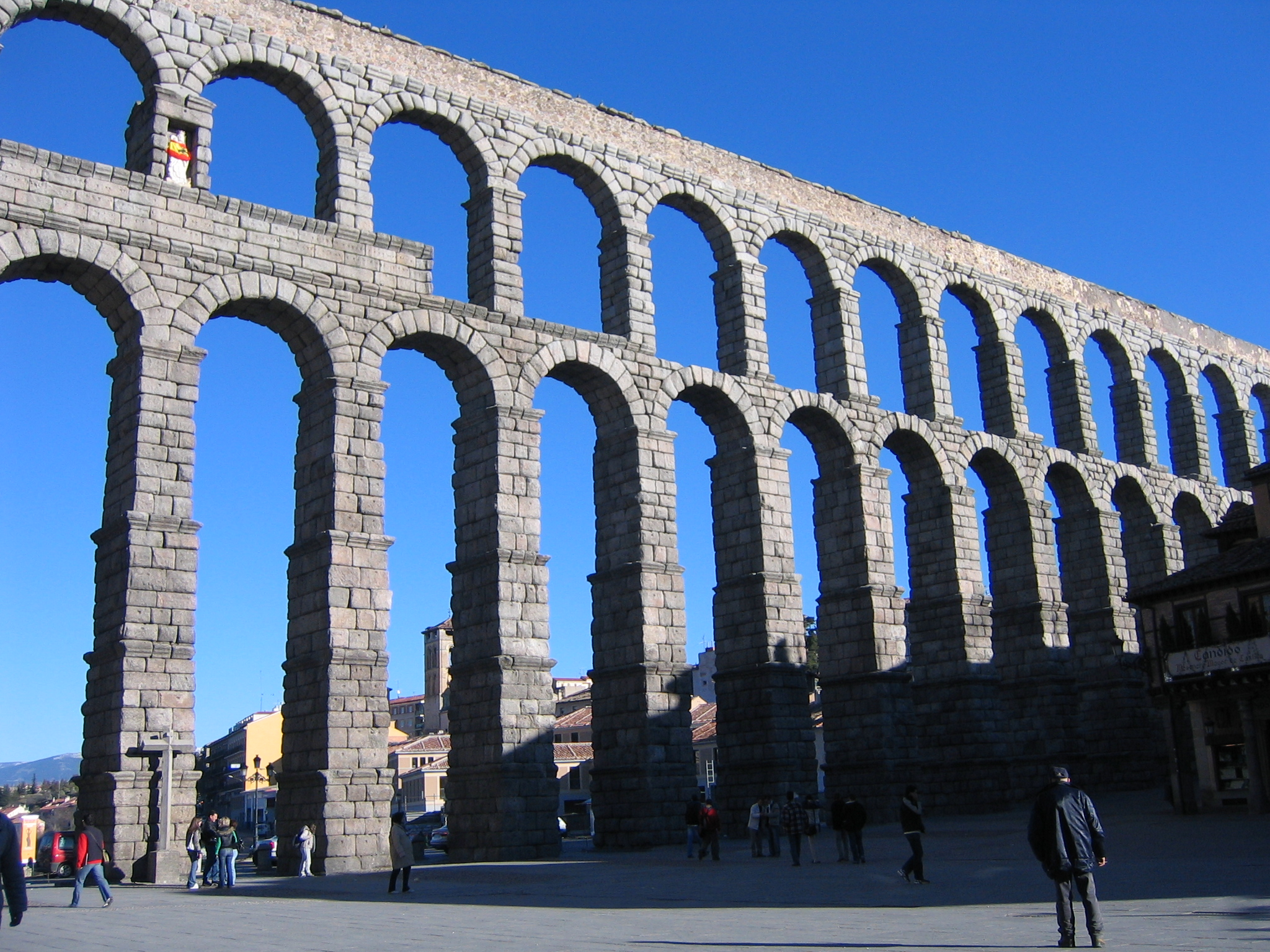
Aqueduct of Segovia, a 1st-century AD masterpiece

In the Roman Empire, different hydraulic applications were developed, including public water supplies, innumerable aqueducts, power using watermills and hydraulic mining. They were among the first to make use of the siphon to carry water across valleys, and used hushing on a large scale to prospect for and then extract metal ores. They used lead widely in plumbing systems for domestic and public supply, such as feeding thermae.

Hydraulic mining was used in the gold-fields of northern Spain, which was conquered by Augustus in 25 BC. The alluvial gold mine of Las Medulas was one of the largest of their mines. At least seven long aqueducts worked it, and the water streams were used to erode the soft deposits, and then wash the tailings for the valuable gold content.

=== Arabic-Islamic world ===
In the Muslim world during the Islamic Golden Age and Arab Agricultural Revolution (8th–13th centuries), engineers made wide use of hydropower as well as early uses of tidal power, and large hydraulic factory complexes. A variety of water-powered industrial mills were used in the Islamic world, including fulling mills, gristmills, paper mills, hullers, sawmills, ship mills, stamp mills, steel mills, sugar mills, and tide mills. By the 11th century, every province throughout the Islamic world had these industrial mills in operation, from Al-Andalus and North Africa to the Middle East and Central Asia. Muslim engineers also used water turbines, employed gears in watermills and water-raising machines, and pioneered the use of dams as a source of water power, used to provide additional power to watermills and water-raising machines.

Al-Jazari (1136–1206) described designs for 50 devices, many of them water-powered, in his book, The Book of Knowledge of Ingenious Mechanical Devices, including water clocks, a device to serve wine, and five devices to lift water from rivers or pools. These include an endless belt with jugs attached and a reciprocating device with hinged valves.

The earliest programmable machines were water-powered devices developed in the Muslim world. A music sequencer, a programmable musical instrument, was the earliest type of programmable machine. The first music sequencer was an automated water-powered flute player invented by the Banu Musa brothers, described in their Book of Ingenious Devices, in the 9th century. In 1206, Al-Jazari invented water-powered programmable automata/robots. He described four automaton musicians, including drummers operated by a programmable drum machine, where they could be made to play different rhythms and different drum patterns.

== Modern history ==
During the mid 16th century, Italian engineer Giuseppe Ceredi advanced the design of the Archimedean screw pump, applying mathematical principles to improve its efficiency for irrigation and drainage and secured a patent for his developments. Ceredi's innovations, documented in Tre discorsi sopra il modo d'alzar acque da' luoghi bassi (1567), led to the widespread adoption of the technology throughout Southern Europe. In 1619 Benedetto Castelli, a student of Galileo Galilei, published the book Della Misura dell'Acque Correnti or "On the Measurement of Running Waters," one of the foundations of modern hydrodynamics. He served as a chief consultant to the Pope on hydraulic projects, i.e., management of rivers in the Papal States, beginning in 1626. The science and engineering of water in Italy from 1500-1800 in books and manuscripts is presented in an illustrated catalog published in 2022.

Blaise Pascal (1623–1662) studied fluid hydrodynamics and hydrostatics, centered on the principles of hydraulic fluids. His discovery on the theory behind hydraulics led to his invention of the hydraulic press, which multiplied a smaller force acting on a smaller area into the application of a larger force totaled over a larger area, transmitted through the same pressure (or exact change of pressure) at both locations. Pascal's law or principle states that for an incompressible fluid at rest, the difference in pressure is proportional to the difference in height, and this difference remains the same whether or not the overall pressure of the fluid is changed by applying an external force. This implies that by increasing the pressure at any point in a confined fluid, there is an equal increase at every other end in the container, i.e., any change in pressure applied at any point of the liquid is transmitted undiminished throughout the fluids.

French physician Poiseuille (1797–1869) researched the flow of blood through the body and discovered an important law governing the rate of flow with the diameter of the tube in which flow occurred.

Several cities developed citywide hydraulic power networks in the 19th century, to operate machinery such as lifts, cranes, capstans and the like. Joseph Bramah (1748–1814) was an early innovator and William Armstrong (1810–1900) perfected the apparatus for power delivery on an industrial scale. In London, the London Hydraulic Power Company was a major supplier. Its pipes serving large parts of the West End of London, City and the Docks, but there were schemes restricted to single enterprises such as docks and railway goods yards.

== Hydraulic models ==
After students understand the basic principles of hydraulics, some teachers use a hydraulic analogy to help students learn other things. For example:

- The MONIAC Computer uses water flowing through hydraulic components to help students learn about economics.
- The thermal–hydraulic analogy uses hydraulic principles to help students learn about thermal circuits.
- The electronic–hydraulic analogy uses hydraulic principles to help students learn about electronics.

The conservation of mass requirement combined with fluid compressibility yields a fundamental relationship between pressure, fluid flow, and volumetric expansion, as shown below:

$$\frac{dp}{dt} = \frac{\beta}{V} \left(\sum_\text{in} Q - \frac{dV}{dt}\right)$$

Assuming an incompressible fluid or a "very large" ratio of compressibility to contained fluid volume, a finite rate of pressure rise requires that any net flow into the collected fluid volume create a volumetric change.

== See also ==
- Affinity laws
- Bernoulli's principle
- Hydraulic brake
- Hydraulic cylinder
- Hydraulic engineering
- Hydrology
- International Association for Hydro-Environment Engineering and Research
- Miniature hydraulics
- Secondary-controlled hydraulic drive
