= List of books on history of number systems =

This list compiles notable works that explore the history and development of number systems across various civilizations and time periods. These works cover topics ranging from ancient numeral systems and arithmetic methods to the evolution of mathematical notations and the impact of numerals on science, trade, and culture.

== Overview ==
Number systems have been central to the development of human civilization, enabling record-keeping, commerce, astronomy, and scientific advancement. Early systems such as tally marks and Roman numerals gradually gave way to more abstract and efficient representations like the Babylonian base-60 system and the Hindu–Arabic numerals, now standard worldwide. The invention of zero, positional notation, and symbolic mathematics has had profound philosophical and technological implications.

== Notable works on the history of number systems ==
| Author | Title | Year | ISBN | Summary |
|---|---|---|---|---|
| Levi Leonard Conant | The Number Concept: Its Origin and Development | 1896 | 978-0266284383 | One of the earliest anthropological studies of how cultures form number concepts. |
| Florian Cajori | A History of Mathematical Notations | 1928 | 978-0486677668 | A pioneering historical account of numeric and algebraic notations. |
| Tobias Dantzig | Number: The Language of Science | 1930 | 9780025295001 | A popular introduction to the philosophical and historical aspects of numbers. |
| Claudia Zaslavsky | Africa Counts | 1973 | 978-1-61374-115-3 | Groundbreaking work on mathematical practices in African cultures. |
| Graham Flegg | Numbers: Their History and Meaning | 1983 | 978-0-8052-3847-1 | A reader-friendly overview of counting and numeral systems. |
| Georges Ifrah | From One to Zero | 1985 | 978-0-14-009919-5 | Condensed history of number systems, preceding his later comprehensive volumes. |
| Thomas Crump | The Anthropology of Numbers | 1992 | 978-0-521-43807-0 | Connects number use to linguistic and cultural patterns. |
| George Gheverghese Joseph | The Crest of the Peacock | 1992 | 978-0-14-012529-0 | Highlights mathematical contributions from non-Western societies. |
| Karl Menninger | Number Words and Number Symbols | 1992 | 9780486319773 | A cultural history of how societies develop number systems. |
| John McLeish | The Story of Numbers | 1994 | 978-0-449-90938-6 | Discusses how number systems shaped civilization. |
| Georges Ifrah | The Universal History of Numbers | 2000 | 978-0-471-37568-5 | Comprehensive global history of numbers. |
| Kim Plofker | Mathematics in India | 2009 | 978-0-691-12067-6 | Documents India’s contribution to mathematics, including place value and zero. |
| Stephen Chrisomalis | Numerical Notation: A Comparative History | 2010 | 978-0-521-87818-0 | Academic analysis of numeral systems across cultures. |
| Keith Devlin | The Man of Numbers | 2011 | 978-0-8027-7812-3 | Biography of Fibonacci and his impact on European numeracy. |
| Karenleigh A. Overmann | The Materiality of Numbers | 2023 | 978-1-009-36124-8 | Investigates how fingers, tallies, tokens, and notations influence the content, structure, and organization of numerical concepts. |

== Works on the history of zero ==
| Author | Title | Year | ISBN | Summary |
|---|---|---|---|---|
| Brian Rotman | Signifying Nothing: The Semiotics of Zero | 1987 | 9780312012021 | Explores the semiotic significance of zero. |
| Robert Kaplan | The Nothing That Is: A Natural History of Zero | 1999 | 9780713992847 | A poetic, historical account of zero’s conceptual journey. |
| Charles Seife | Zero: The Biography of a Dangerous Idea | 2000 | 978-0-670-88457-5 | Popular science exploration of zero's impact on math and culture. |

== Children's books on the history of numbers ==
| Author | Title | Year | Publisher | Summary |
|---|---|---|---|---|
| Mitsumasa Anno | Anno's Mysterious Multiplying Jar | 1983 | Philomel Books | Introduces factorials through a visual and narrative journey. |
| Kathryn Lasky | The Librarian Who Measured the Earth | 1994 | Little, Brown and Company | Biography of Eratosthenes, who calculated Earth's circumference. |
| Denise Schmandt-Besserat | The History of Counting | 1999 | HarperCollins | Chronicles the evolution of counting systems across cultures. |
| Joseph D’Agnese | Blockhead: The Life of Fibonacci | 2010 | Henry Holt & Co. | Story of Fibonacci and his influence on number systems. |
| David Reimer | Count Like an Egyptian | 2014 | Princeton University Press | Engaging introduction to ancient Egyptian mathematics and calculating methods. |
| David A. Adler | Place Value | 2016 | Holiday House | Child-friendly explanation of place value and number evolution. |
| Nandini Chakrabarti | Who Owns the Numbers? | 2022 | Blueberry Illustrations | Simplified introduction to the history of our number system for young readers. |

== Historical texts ==
| Author | Title | Year | Summary |
|---|---|---|---|
| Euclid | Elements | c. 300 BCE | Laid foundations for number theory and geometry using axiomatic methods. |
| Aryabhata | Aryabhatiya | 499 CE | Described place-value numerals and concepts foundational to Indian mathematics. |
| Brahmagupta | Brahmasphutasiddhanta | 628 CE | Defined zero as a number and explained rules for its arithmetic. |
| Muhammad ibn Musa al-Khwarizmi | On the Calculation with Hindu Numerals | c. 825 CE | Early Arabic work spreading Hindu numeral use in the Islamic world. |
| Fibonacci | Liber Abaci | 1202 | Introduced Hindu–Arabic numerals and arithmetic to Europe. |
| Ibn al-Banna | Talkhis amal al-hisab | 13th century | Arabic treatise integrating Indian and Greek arithmetic traditions. |
| Nicolas Chuquet | Triparty en la science des nombres | 1484 | One of the earliest European texts using exponents and large numbers. |
| Boethius | De Institutione Arithmetica | 6th century CE (pub. 1488) | Preserved Greek number theory in Latin during the early Middle Ages. |
| Simon Stevin | De Thiende | 1585 | Promoted the use of decimal fractions in European mathematics. |
| John Napier | Mirifici Logarithmorum Canonis Descriptio | 1614 | Introduced logarithms, aiding calculation with large numbers. |
| Gottlob Frege | The Foundations of Arithmetic | 1884 | Philosophical treatise exploring the concept of number. |
| Giuseppe Peano | Arithmetices principia, nova methodo exposita | 1889 | Introduced Peano's axioms for the natural numbers. |
| Alfred North Whitehead and Bertrand Russell | Principia Mathematica | 1910–1913 | Defined numbers using set theory, constructing the natural numbers through iteration. |
