= 1928 in science =

The year 1928 in science and technology involved some significant events, listed below.

== Anthropology ==
- American anthropologist Margaret Mead publishes Coming of Age in Samoa, "a psychological study of primitive youth for Western civilization".

== Archaeology ==
- The old Canaanite city of Ugarit is rediscovered.

== Biology ==
- January – Frederick Griffith reports the results of Griffith's experiment, indirectly proving the existence of DNA.
- September 28 – Scottish-born microbiologist Alexander Fleming, at St Mary's Hospital, London, accidentally rediscovers the antibiotic which he will call Penicillin, forgotten since Ernest Duchesne's original discovery in 1896.
- American biogerontologist Raymond Pearl publishes his Rate of Living Hypothesis, proposing that lifespan is shorter in animals with faster metabolisms.

== Chemistry ==
- The Diels-Alder reaction is first described by German chemists Otto Diels and Kurt Alder.
- Bubble gum is invented by Walter Diemer in the United States.

== Computer science ==
- April – Leslie Comrie publishes an article "On the Construction of Tables by Interpolation", describing the use of punched card equipment for interpolating tables of data, and becomes the first to use such equipment for scientific calculations, using Fourier synthesis to compute the principal terms in the motion of the Moon for 1935–2000.

== History of science ==
- Florian Cajori begins publication of A History of Mathematical Notations.

== Mathematics ==
- David Hilbert and Wilhelm Ackermann publish Grundzüge der theoretischen Logik, a pioneering elementary text in first-order logic stating the Entscheidungsproblem.
- John von Neumann publishes Zur Theorie der Gesellschaftsspiele, a text in game theory.

== Medicine ==
- October 12 – An 'iron lung' medical ventilator designed by Philip Drinker and Louis Agassiz Shaw, Jr., is used for the first time, at Boston Children's Hospital in the United States for treatment of poliomyelitis.
- Dementia pugilistica is first described by forensic pathologist Dr. Harrison Stanford Martland, chief medical examiner of Essex County, New Jersey.

== Physics ==
- February 28 – C. V. Raman and K. S. Krishnan discover Raman scattering in liquids.
- Paul Dirac proposes the Dirac equation as a relativistic equation of motion for the wavefunction of the electron, leading him to predict the existence of the positron, the electron's antiparticle.
- Hermann Weyl publishes Gruppentheorie und Quantenmechanik in Leipzig.

== Technology ==
- February 8 – British inventor John Logie Baird broadcasts a transatlantic television signal from London to Hartsdale, New York.
- June 11
  - Hungarian inventor Kálmán Tihanyi files patents in Germany, the United Kingdom and France for a cathode ray television transmission system.
  - The Lippisch Ente becomes the first aircraft to fly under rocket power, completing a 1,500-meter (4,900-foot) circuit of the landing strip at the Wasserkuppe in Germany as part of the Opel RAK program led by Max Valier and Fritz von Opel.
- July 3
  - British inventor John Logie Baird demonstrates the world's first color television transmission, using scanning discs.
  - Ulster-born engineer Harry Ferguson obtains a British patent for his three-point linkage for tractors.
- July 7 – The first machine-sliced and machine-wrapped loaf of bread is sold in Chillicothe, Missouri, using Otto Frederick Rohwedder's technology.
- September 3 – Philo Farnsworth demonstrates to the Press the world's first working all-electronic television system, employing electronic scanning in both the pickup and display devices.
- December – Completion of the Maurzyce Bridge near Łowicz in central Poland, the world's first road bridge of wholly welded construction, designed by Stefan Bryła.
- The concrete pump is invented by German Max Giese.
- Magnetic tape is invented by German Fritz Pfleumer.

== Publications ==
- Arthur Eddington publishes the popular text The Nature of the Physical World in the United Kingdom, including a statement of the infinite monkey theorem.

== Awards ==
- Nobel Prizes
  - Physics – Owen Willans Richardson
  - Chemistry – Adolf Otto Reinhold Windaus
  - Medicine – Charles Jules Henri Nicolle

== Births ==
- January 4 – Henry T. Lynch (died 2019), American cancer geneticist.
- January 12 – Gerald Russell (died 2018), British psychiatrist.
- January 14 – Hans Kornberg (died 2019), German-English biochemist.
- February 14 – Sergey Kapitsa (died 2018), Russian physicist and demographer.
- February 18 – John Ostrom (died 2005), American paleontologist.
- March 8 – Gerald Bull (killed 1990), Canadian ballistics engineer.
- March 14 – Frank Borman (died 2023), American astronaut.
- March 25 – Jim Lovell (died 2025), American astronaut.
- March 28 – Alexander Grothendieck (died 2014), German-born French mathematician, pioneer of modern algebraic geometry.
- April 6 – James Watson (died 2025), American geneticist.
- April 20 – Charles David Keeling (died 2005), American atmospheric chemist, geochemist and oceanographer.
- April 29 – Heinz Wolff (died 2017), German-born British bioengineer and science populariser.
- May 2 – Hans Trass (died 2017), Estonian ecologist and botanist.
- May 4 – Bill Mollison (died 2016), Australian biologist, pioneer of permaculture.
- May 23 – Jean E. Sammet (died 2017), American computer programmer.
- May 26 – Jack Kevorkian (died 2011), American pathologist, advocate of euthanasia.
- June 2 – Wu Xinzhi (died 2021), Chinese paleoanthropologist.
- June 13 – John Forbes Nash, Jr. (died 2015), American mathematician, Nobel Memorial Prize in Economic Sciences laureate.
- June 25 – Alexei Alexeyevich Abrikosov (died 2017), Russian physicist, Nobel Prize laureate.
- July 6 – Bernard Malgrange (died 2024), French mathematician.
- July 12 – Elias James Corey, American chemist, Nobel Prize laureate.
- July 23 – Vera Rubin, née Cooper (died 2016), American astronomer.
- August 25 – Herbert Kroemer, German-born physicist, Nobel Prize laureate.
- September 7 – Donald Henderson (died 2016), American epidemiologist.
- October 7 – Lorna Wing, née Tolchard (died 2014), English psychiatrist.
- October 25 – Peter Naur (died 2016), Danish data scientist.
- October 26 – Erich Kukk (died 2017), Estonian phycologist and conservationist.
- October 30 – Daniel Nathans (died 1999), American microbiologist, Nobel Prize in Physiology or Medicine laureate.
- November 22 – Bill Chaloner (died 2016), English palaeobotanist.
- November 28 – Tove Birkelund (died 1986), Danish historical geologist.
- December 26 – Martin Cooper, American "father of the mobile phone".

== Deaths ==
- February 4 – Hendrik Lorentz (born 1853), Dutch physicist and Nobel laureate.
- February 5 – Xavier Arnozan (born 1852), French physician.
- February 8 – Theodor Curtius (born 1857), German chemist.
- March 19
  - David Ferrier (born 1843), Scottish-born neurologist.
  - Emil Wiechert (born 1861), German physicist and geophysicist.
- March 21 – E. Walter Maunder (born 1851), English astronomer.
- April 2 – Theodore William Richards (born 1868), American chemist, Nobel Prize laureate.
- May 21 – Hideyo Noguchi (born 1876), Japanese bacteriologist.
- August 30 – Wilhelm Wien (born 1864), German physicist.
- October 29 – John Macintyre (born 1857), Scottish laryngologist and pioneer radiographer.
