= High-density solids pump =

Hydrostatic machines

High-density solids pumps are hydrostatically operating machines which displace the medium being pumped and thus create a flow.

== High-density solids and their transport ==
High-density solids are mixtures of liquid and solid constituents; examples include farm grain, pulled pork, etc. Each have its own typical physical and chemical characteristics such as specific weight, solids content, and maximum particle size as well as how they behave, for example thixotropically, abrasively or adhesively.

Typical examples of high-density solids are concrete, sludges and slurries.

Within industrial plants many substances with a high proportion of solids - such as mechanically dewatered sewage sludges, filter cakes, bituminous coal sludges, waste and process sludges - have to be transported over relatively long distances to landfills or incineration plants.

In principle, such long distances can be bridged with mechanical conveying equipment or high-density solids pumps.

Types of mechanical conveyors include belts, screws (worm) and scrapers. They are suitable for nearly all types of high-density solids.

High-density solids pumps move sludges and slurries within an enclosed pipeline. However, not every sludge or slurry is pumpable, depending on:

- Ratio: The mixture of solid and liquid components must be such that it results in a plastically deformable mass.
- Saturation: The volume of pore space in the sludges must be filled with a sufficient quantity of liquid matter for a particle to be able to rest on the particle via a plastically viscous liquid and for the interstices to be filled.
- Gas component: By injection of gasses, sludges which do not naturally have a gas component can be brought to a pumpable consistency.

== Types of high-density solids pumps ==
Depending on how the displacement principle is implemented, a distinction can be drawn between rotary and reciprocating pumps. The rotary circulation pumps includes eccentric screw pumps, centrifugal pumps, and squeezed tube (peristaltic) pumps. Reciprocating pumps include plunger, diaphragm, and piston pumps.

The high-density solids pumps which can be used in the widest range of situations are piston (or reciprocating) pumps. They can be realized as single-cylinder or two-cylinder pumps. In the latter case, power is transferred to the material via delivery pistons working in push-pull-mode. While one delivery piston sucks material from the feed hopper into the cylinder, the second piston simultaneously pushes the material in the other delivery cylinder and into the delivery line.

== Types of piston pumps ==
To make a pump out of a reciprocating piston, some mechanism enforce unidirectional flow from the inlet to the cylinder to the outlet. Thinner fluids can use simple check valves, but solids pumps require more elaborate mechanisms.

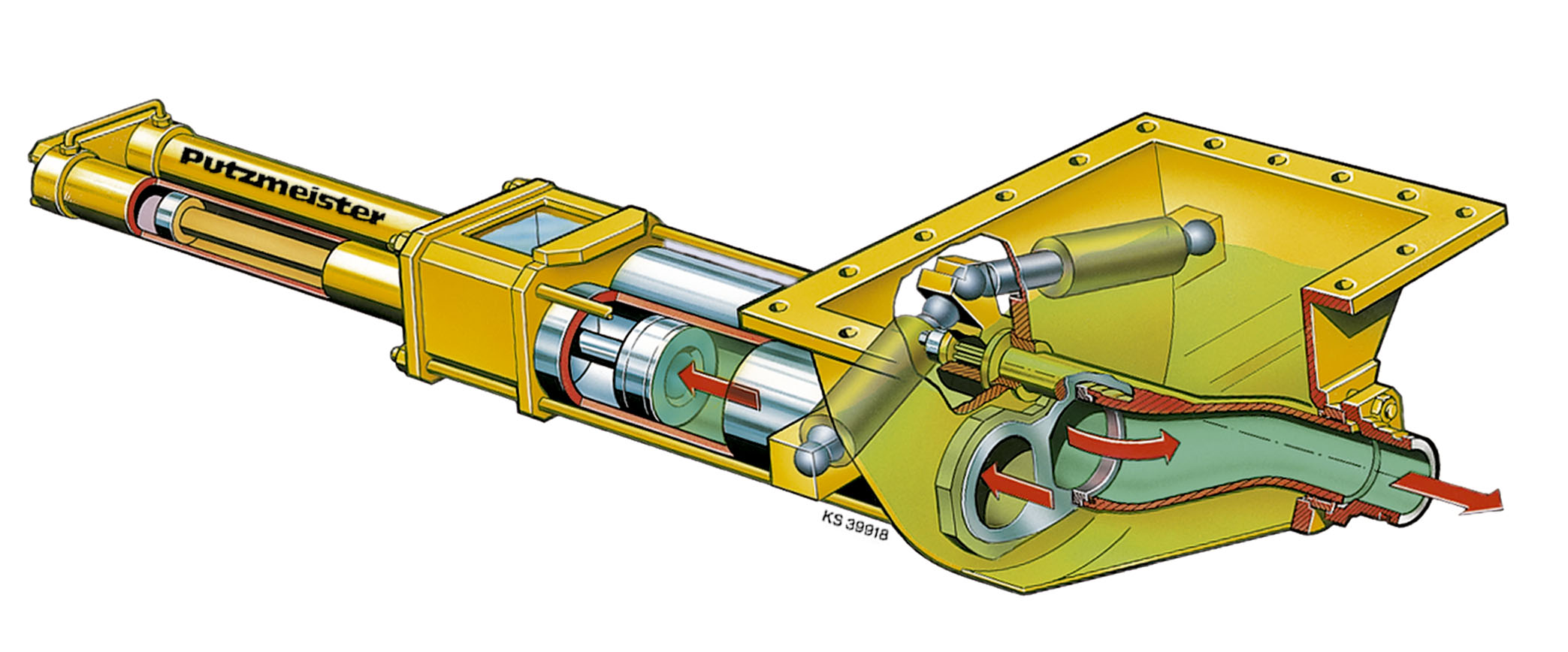
Piston pump with transfer tube

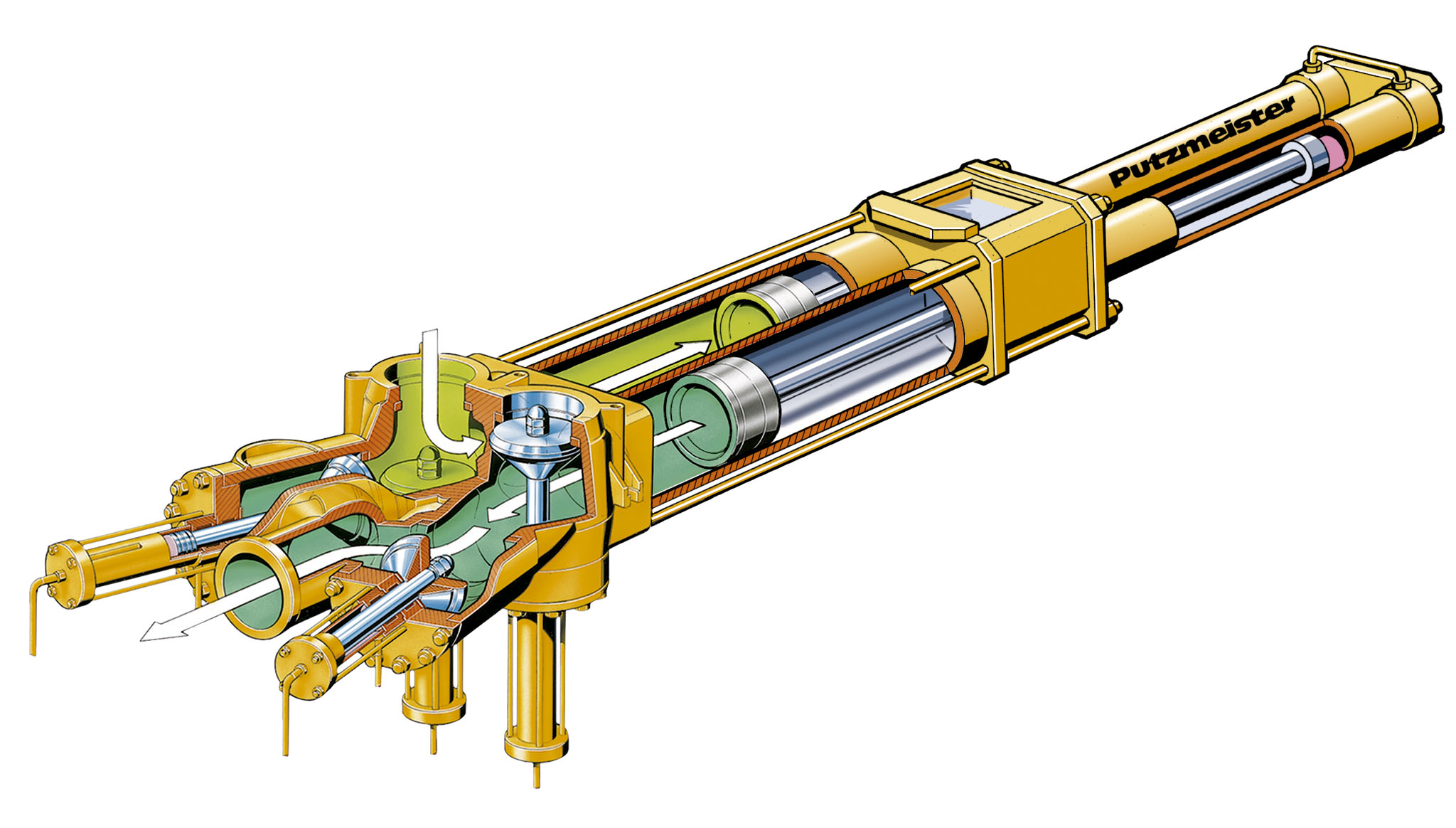
Piston pump with seat valve

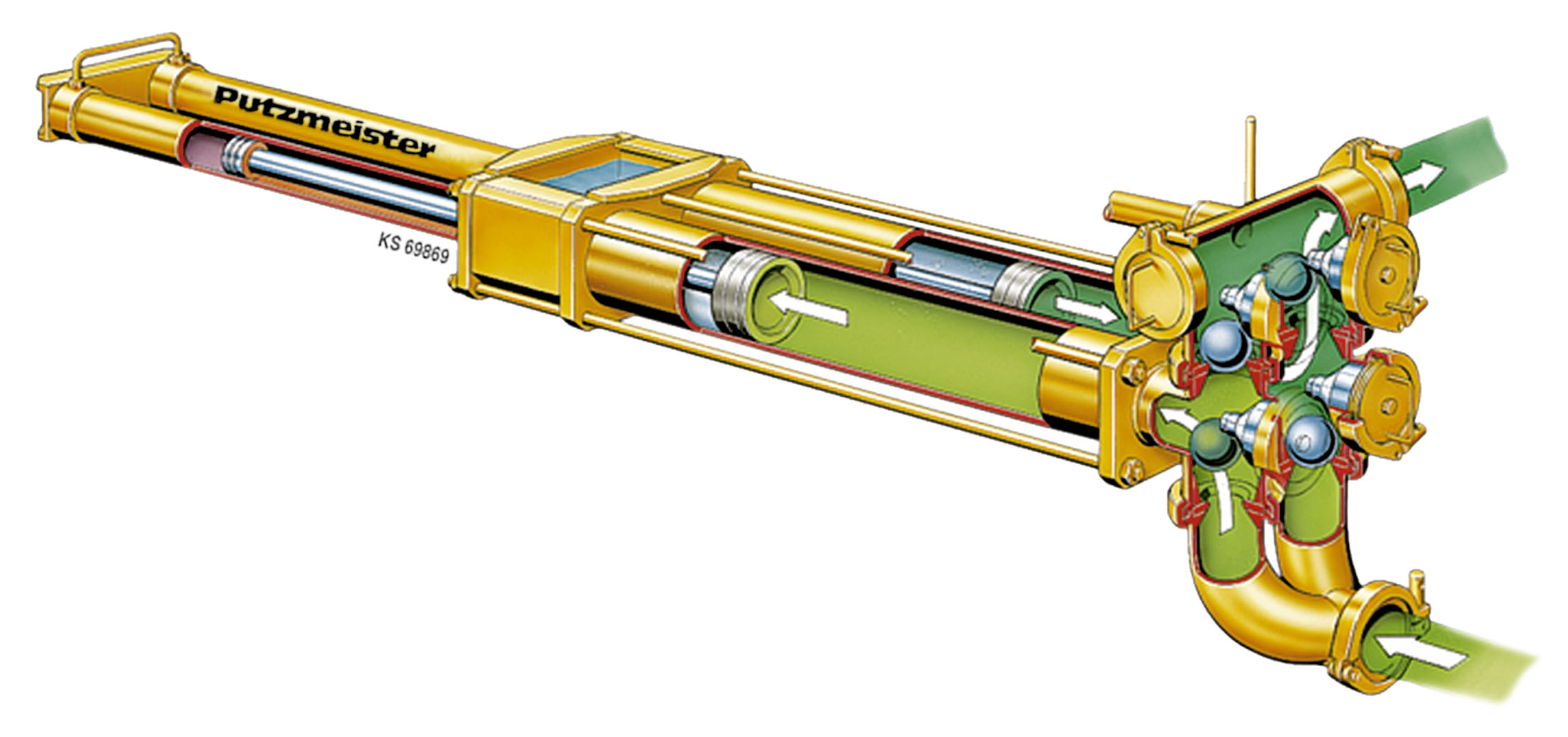
Ball valve pump

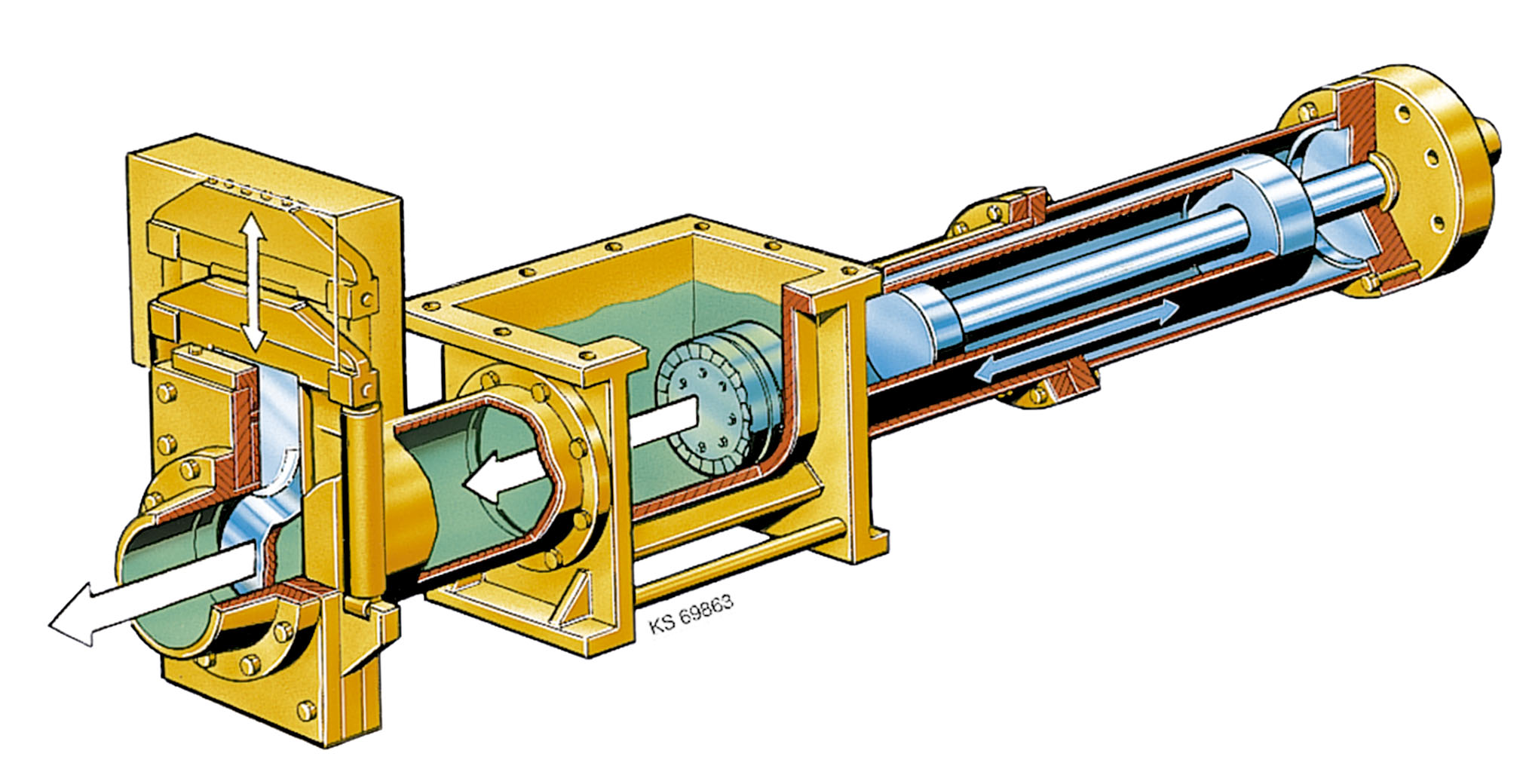
Single-cylinder piston pump

=== Type: Piston pump with transfer tube (two-cylinder pump) ===
Operating principle of piston pump with transfer tube

==== Construction details ====
The most characteristic element of the transfer tube pump is S-shaped "transfer tube" installed inside the feed hopper, which connects the advancing piston to the outlet. In other words, the pump cylinder which is currently pushing the material is connected to the delivery line by the transfer tube, while the retracting (pulling) cylinder is open to the feed hopper. At the end of each piston stroke, the transfer tube is swung over to the other piston with the aid of two switch cylinders. A hydraulic circuit is used for synchronizing the position of the transfer tube and the movements of the two delivery pistons.

The S tube should swing over rapidly and not suffer undue wear. This is effected with two large-sized plunger cylinders and a so-called spectacle plate (so named from its shape) including seal rings.

In cross section the S-tube is circular with a diameter which tapers in the direction of flow. This keeps the risk of clogging down. The sealing faces of the spectacle plate and of the seal ring lie parallel with the swivelling movement of the S-tube, so that they cannot be damaged when foreign bodies are cut through or get stuck.

==== Operating features ====
Piston pumps with S-tube are suitable for concrete and mortar, for sludges with a solids content of up to 50% by weight and a fluctuating particle size distribution but also for conveying fly ash, coal or minerals in a suspension.

The large cross section of the holes in the spectacle plate means that with a delivery cylinder diameter of e.g. 200 mm (7.874 in) it is possible to pump high-density solids with a mean grain size of as much as 80 mm (3.150 in). The maximum diameter of individual foreign bodies may be as high as 60% of the diameter of the delivery line - in this example this would be 120 mm (4.724 in).

=== Type: Piston pump with seat valves (two-cylinder pump) ===
Operating principle of piston pump with seat valves

==== Construction details ====
In lieu of check valves operated by the fluid being pumped, the steel housing of a seat valve pump contains four hydraulically operated seat valves, one suction and one delivery valve per piston. The suction and discharge valves are synchronized with the hydraulics of the delivery pistons - this ensures that the contents of the delivery cylinder is equal at all times to the volume being pumped. Once the "sucking" piston reaches its end position, the corresponding suction or delivery valve is simultaneously closed or opened. If there is overpressure in the delivery line, the suction valve will close first. This prevents the pumped medium from being pushed out of the pressure line back into the hopper.

==== Operating features ====
Seat valve pumps are suitable for an especially even pumping of media with a solids content of up to 50% and for the high-pressure pumping of paste-like industrial media such as sludges. Since valves are used in this two-cylinder pump. it is limited to grain sizes of 8 mm at most.

Which type of valve is selected will depend on the high-density solids to be conveyed. For materials containing grains with a solids content up to 50% a sharp-edged metal valve seat is required. With low-viscosity, rather watery fine sludges the choice would be a large-area elastomeric valve seal.

In one hydraulic control variant the valve is opened passively by the thrust of the medium. In this case the discharge valve has a non-return function which prevents flowback from the pressure line. At the same time the high-density solids are precompacted to close to the line pressure before the discharge valve opens. This means that pipe knocking resulting from pressure pulsations can be avoided.

=== Type: Ball-valve pump (two-cylinder pump) ===
This style uses ball check valves to enforce the direction of flow.

==== Construction details ====
During the suction stroke of the delivery piston the medium is sucked in via the open suction ball valve. At the same time the ball valve on the delivery line is pushed into the valve seating by the underpressure resulting from the suction (automatic valves). In parallel with this, the second delivery piston is making the pressure stroke and forces the medium through the discharge ball valve and into the delivery line. The suction ball valve is pushed into its seating by the delivery line pressure and thereby closes off the connection to pump intake.

==== Operating features ====
The two-cylinder ball valve pump is suitable for in the low to middle pressure range for pumping highly liquid to paste-like media provided these can be sucked in through the valve openings - for example mortars, mineral and sewage sludges.

The ball valve pump is to all intents and purposes insensitive to corrosive and fine abrasive media since the ball valves do not have to be opened or closed from the outside.

=== Type: Single-cylinder piston pump ===
==== Construction details ====
With a single-cylinder piston pump the medium is "stuffed" out of a feed chute into the delivery cylinder and by the cylinder into the delivery line on the forward stroke. Depending on the level of the delivery pressure in the pipe and on the flow properties of the medium, the delivery flange of the pump will be fitted with a flat slide valve or a lamellar non-return valve in order to prevent flowback of the material on the return stroke. Which delivery piston is actually selected will depend on the material which is to be pumped: Free flowing media call for perturbane sealing elements while bulky materials which have to be chopped up during pumping mean that hardened cutting edges are required.

==== Operating features ====
The single-cylinder pump is suitable for bulk materials with an awkward coarse composition - for example wood chips, organic waste, hazardous waste, or shredded paper. If such unsaturated material is to be conveyed over large distances, one possible approach is the hybrid feed system. Here compressed air is injected into the delivery line. It presses the plug of material into the pipe. As the compressed air expands the material being conveyed is loosened and separated. As distance increases from the air injection point, what was initially a series of plugs gradually turns into a continuous airborne stream. The amount of air required, and the appropriate pipe diameter depend on the type and quantity of matter being conveyed.

=== Type: Single-cylinder piston pump with an off-center three-way rotary gate valve ===
The said type of gate valve is having a rotating member inside a rotating valve chamber wherein the center of the valve chamber is offset with the center line of the pumping cylinder and the pumping cylinder, and the delivery pipe are on the same axis. Further the value of the offset decides the thickness of the rotating member's sealing portion as it is provided a cut section equivalent to the diameter of the pumping cylinder. This invention eliminates the through hole design of the rotary valve and also introduces a replaceable cutting edge for the rotating member. Further this valve ensures that it displaces minimum concrete during its operation and ensures elimination of dead zones. Further the symmetrical design of the rotating member & the valve chamber allow the end user to repair the valve by using conventional means of machining such as a normal lathe machine. This impossible with S-tube valve or rock valve. This valve has been invented by Amit and Anand Gokhale.

== Parts of high-density solids piston pumps ==
Main parts are:

- feed hopper
- drive cylinder, delivery cylinder and hydraulic system
- seals
- electrical and control equipment

and - depending on the type:

- transfer tube
- valves

as well as peripheral components such as:

- bunker (with / without sliding frames)
- screw conveyors, pre-press equipment
- pipework
- air injection
- boundary layer injection
- systems for pressure (pulsation) damping

== Solids pump selection ==
The special kind of medium "high-density solids" and the wide range of applications require different construction principles and hence pump types. Following table permits a pre-selection depending on the media characteristics:

Type	Medium (high-density solids)
Type	watery	stiff	bulky	with foreign bodies
Transfer type pump	+	+ +	-	+
Seat valve pump	+ +	+	-	-
Ball valve pump	+	o	-	-
Single-cylinder pump	-	+ +	+ +	+ +
+ + very suitable, + suitable, o with reservations, - not suitable

== Applications ==
The pumping of solids with high solids contents offers a range of possibilities in process engineering. Oil-hydraulically powered two-cylinder piston pumps with S-transfer tube have already been used for many years in civil engineering for transporting concrete. This technology has been transferred to further areas of application in various sectors of industry.

=== Sewage treatment plants ===
Mechanically dewatered sewage sludge can be pumped directly into furnaces via a pipe network. This avoids direct contact with the sludges and prevents from contamination and odour emission.

=== Waste management (Hazardous waste) ===
Hazardous and highly flammable substances are processed physically, chemically and biologically in order to reduce the waste materials. With the advantage of pipeline conveyance, high density solids pumps commonly transport such material.

=== Mining ===
Real tunneling (in other words, not cut-and-cover) has increased palpably in recent years. Conveying mine water, soil and tailings to the tunnel entrance is a need.

== Boundary conditions ==
=== Transport routes ===
Various aspects have to be considered in the planning and processing of conveying installations. This includes the space requirements, the accessibility in case of maintenance or cleaning purposes, as well as horizontal or vertical transport route for material discharge.

=== Environmental protection (Noise and odour reduction) ===
Due to the nature of the material and the conveying method, odour nuisances is to be expected. Choosing the appropriate conveying method can reduce the environmental pollution

=== Energy expenditure ===
Three forces have to be overcome when conveying with high density solids pumps:

1. The conveying distance (cf. Record held by Concrete pump)
2. Friction between material and pipeline, especially in bends and reduction joints.
3. Inner frictional force caused by deformation of the material.

Calculation example:

- Conveyance suspension
- Delivery line of 200 mm (8 in) diameter (DN200)
- High-density solids with mineral or carbon content as a mixture from coarse and fine grained material.
- Maximum particle size 50 mm (1.969 in)
- Dry solids content up to 80 percent by weight

Energy consumption = approx. 50 Wh (180 kJ) per tonne of conveyed material and per kilometer (280 Btu per long ton or 250 Btu per short ton per mile).

== See also ==
- Concrete pump
- Slurry transport
- Hydraulic transport of solid particles
