= Numerical Notation: A Comparative History =

Numerical Notation: A Comparative History is a book by Stephen Chrisomalis that covers the histories of number systems used around the world. Based originally on the author's PhD thesis at McGill University, it was published by Cambridge University Press in 2010.

== Contents ==
Chrisomalis classifies the number systems he describes into eight broad groups: Hieroglyphic, Levantine, Italic, Alphabetic, South Asian, Mesopotamian, East Asian, and Mesoamerican. In addition, he includes a separate chapter for "miscellaneous" systems that do not fit into any of the other groups. Each number system is illustrated in tabular form, and over a hundred systems are covered in all. Following these chapters, Chrisomalis then discusses regularities across number systems, and factors that have influenced how number systems have evolved.

== Reception ==
Ivor Grattan-Guinness found that the book "establishes itself as a substantial achievement in the intersection of the history of mathematics with anthropology", reserving special praise for the chapters that reflect upon number-system evolution from social and cognitive perspectives. He noted that Chrisomalis could also have included the Braille system for writing numbers, as well as a possible predecessor to Roman numerals. Despite these omissions, he regarded the book as unparalleled in its comprehensiveness. G. E. R. Lloyd also deemed the book more comprehensive than prior works on the subject. Lloyd praised the detail and care of Chrisomalis' descriptions, observing that the emphasis which Chrisomalis put upon practical applications like commerce meant "rather less discussion than one might expect" about pure mathematics. Christophe Heintz called the book "quite an achievement in cultural evolutionary study", writing with approval of how Chrisomalis refrains from presenting a "grand theory" that would gloss over intricacies and details.

Ernest Davis gave the book a positive review in SIAM News. For Davis, the most interesting aspect of the book was its discussion of the features that hold across all or nearly all of the number systems it covers, such as bases being multiples of ten. Davis found Chrisomalis' descriptions "impeccably clear, but unavoidably somewhat dry", the latter being alleviated by "fascinating historical and cultural tidbits along the way".

Reviewing the book for the Institute of Mathematics and its Applications, Eugene Kidwell described it as "comprehensive, encyclopaedic and scholarly", suggesting that it "will equally be of interest to the anthropologist, historian of science, or linguist". D. M. Hutton deemed the book "of great merit" and opined that it could either be read chapter-by-chapter or used as a reference work. Fernando Q. Gouvêa argued that it supersedes the treatment of ancient numeration in Florian Cajori's venerable mainstay, A History of Mathematical Notations.

Georg Schuppener found the book lacking in features likely to appeal to "the general public" and noted that Chrisomalis generally avoided the linguistics of number representation. Even so, he commented, the book "will become a landmark volume in numerical notations".
