= Cajori (crater) =

Crater on the Moon

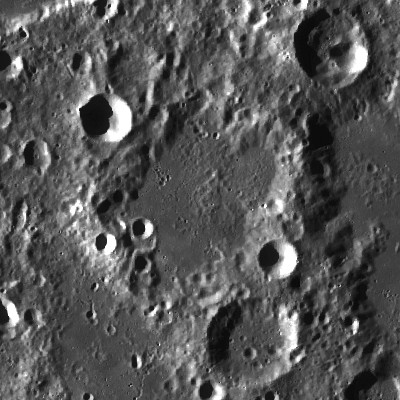
- LRO image
- Coordinates: 47.4°S 168.8°E
- Diameter: 74.65 km (46.39 mi)
- Depth: Unknown
- Colongitude: 192° at sunrise
- Eponym: Florian Cajori

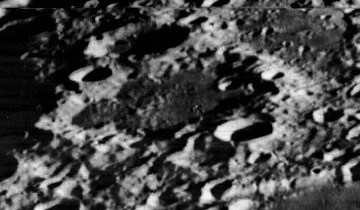
Oblique Lunar Orbiter 2 view, facing south

Cajori is a lunar impact crater that is located in the southern hemisphere on the far side of the Moon. It lies within the South Pole–Aitken basin, to the southwest of a walled plain called Von Kármán, and to the east-southeast of the crater Chrétien.

The outer rim of Cajori has been heavily damaged by impacts, leaving a disintegrating outer perimeter that is irregular and notched along its edges. Several small craters lie along the edge, with the most notable being Cajori K attached to the southeast rim. The inner floor is less heavily impacted, and is marked only by some tiny craterlets.

This crater is named for the Swiss-American historian of mathematics, Florian Cajori (1859–1930). Its name was adopted by the International Astronomical Union in 1970.

== Satellite craters ==
By convention these features are identified on lunar maps by placing the letter on the side of the crater midpoint that is closest to Cajori.

| Cajori | Latitude | Longitude | Diameter |
|---|---|---|---|
| K | 49.1° S | 169.8° E | 32 km |
