= Slurry transport =

Slurry transport uses several methods: hydraulic conveying; conventional lean slurry conveying; and high concentration slurry disposal (HCSD). The latter, HCSD, is a relatively modern approach, which is used to transfer high throughputs of fine fly ash over long distances (>10 km or 6.2 mi) using high pressure diaphragm pumps with velocities of around 2 m/s. Ash disposal is simple as the ash solidifies easily and the system does not produce the waste water or leachate problems which can often be associated with ash lagoons.

== Examples ==
Typical HCSD systems include the Clyde Bergemann solution designed to reduce water usage (up to 90% by weight), reduce ground and surface water pollution, reduce dust emission surrounding landfill site, increase disposal area working capacity and lower energy consumption.

== See also ==
- High-density solids pump
