= A History of Mathematical Notations =

1928–1929 nonfiction book by Florian Cajori

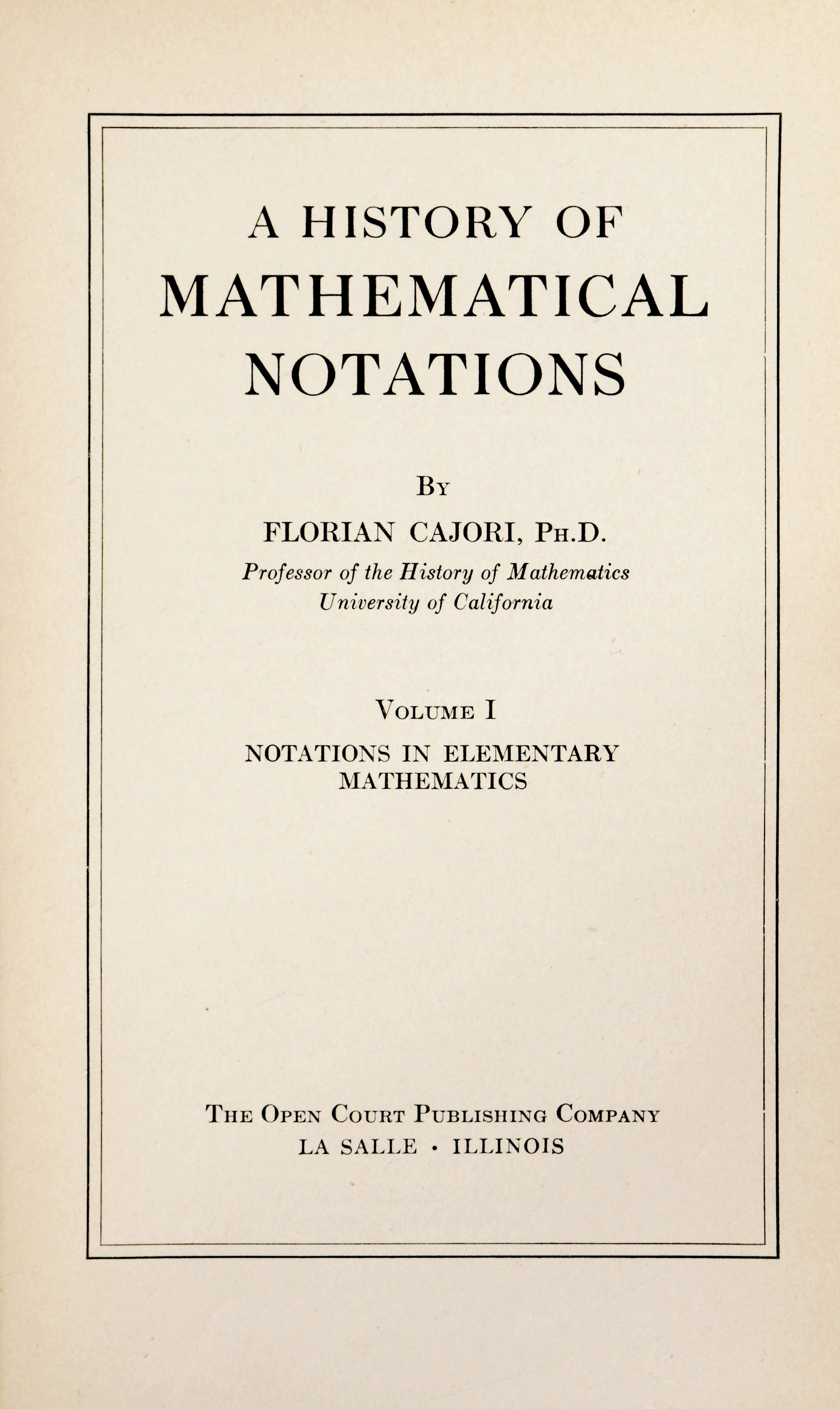
- Title page of volume I
- Author: Florian Cajori
- Publisher: Open Court Publishing Company
- Publication date: 1928

A History of Mathematical Notations is a book on the history of mathematics and of mathematical notation. It was written by Swiss-American historian of mathematics Florian Cajori (1859–1930), and originally published as a two-volume set by the Open Court Publishing Company in 1928 and 1929, with the subtitles Volume I: Notations in Elementary Mathematics (1928) and Volume II: Notations Mainly in Higher Mathematics (1929). Although Open Court republished it in a second edition in 1974, it was unchanged from the first edition. In 1993, it was published as an 820-page single volume edition by Dover Publications, with its original pagination unchanged.

The Basic Library List Committee of the Mathematical Association of America has listed this book as essential for inclusion in undergraduate mathematics libraries. It was already described as long-awaited at the time of its publication, and by 2013, when the Dover edition was reviewed by Fernando Q. Gouvêa, he wrote that it was "one of those books so well known that it doesn’t need a review". However, some of its claims on the history of the notations it describes have been subsumed by more recent research, and its coverage of modern mathematics is limited, so it should be used with care as a reference.

== Topics ==
The first volume of the book concerns elementary mathematics. It has 400 pages of material on arithmetic. This includes the history of notation for numbers from many ancient cultures, arranged by culture, with the Hindu–Arabic numeral system treated separately. Following this, it covers notation for arithmetic operations, arranged separately by operation and by the mathematicians who used those notations (although not in strict chronological order). To show that notation can affect operations, he treats operations in signed-digit representation (page 57). The first volume concludes with 30 pages on elementary geometry, including also the struggle between symbolists and rhetoricians in the 18th and 19th centuries on whether to express mathematics in notation or words, respectively.

The second volume is divided more evenly into four parts. The first part, on arithmetic and algebra, also includes mathematical constants and special functions that would nowadays be considered part of mathematical analysis, as well as notations for binomial coefficients and other topics in combinatorics, and even the history of the dollar sign. The second part is entitled "modern analysis", but its topics are primarily trigonometry, calculus, and mathematical logic, including the conflicting calculus notations of Isaac Newton and Gottfried Wilhelm Leibniz. The third part concerns geometry, while the fourth concerns scholarship in the history of mathematics as well as the movement for international standardization.

== Audience and reception ==
This book is mainly a reference work and sourcebook, containing excerpts from many texts illustrating their use of notation.

Among reviewers from the time of the work's original publication, George Sarton took as the main lesson from the book "the slowness and timidity of human advance", while some other reviewers took the different view that the confusing multiplicity of notations documented by the book should lead to a greater push for standardization. Although praising the book's "richness of explanation" and "familiarity with the ground", Lao Genevra Simons expressed a wish that Cajori had access to a greater number of original sources, and pointed to some historical inaccuracies in the work. Sarton concluded, accurately, that the book "will remain a standard work for many years to come". Although one reviewer found the treatment of dollar signs appropriate for an American book, the reviewer G. Feigl disagreed, regarding this subject as off-topic.

In 1974, and echoing Feigl, reviewer Herbert Meschkowski complained that the book's coverage of mathematics from after the beginning of the 19th century was inadequate. In a review published in 2013, Fernando Q. Gouvêa wrote that the book remained useful, especially for its photographic reproductions of samples of old notation. He added that it was still the only comprehensive text in this area, although other works cover more specialized subtopics. However, Gouvêa wrote that modern scholarship on the numbering systems of past civilizations and on the first uses of some symbols has changed since Cajori's work, so such claims need to be checked against more recent publications instead of taking Cajori's word for them. In the case of ancient number systems, Gouvêa recommends instead Numerical Notation: A Comparative History by Stephen Chrisomalis (Cambridge University Press, 2010).
