= Slurry =

Mixture of solids suspended in liquid

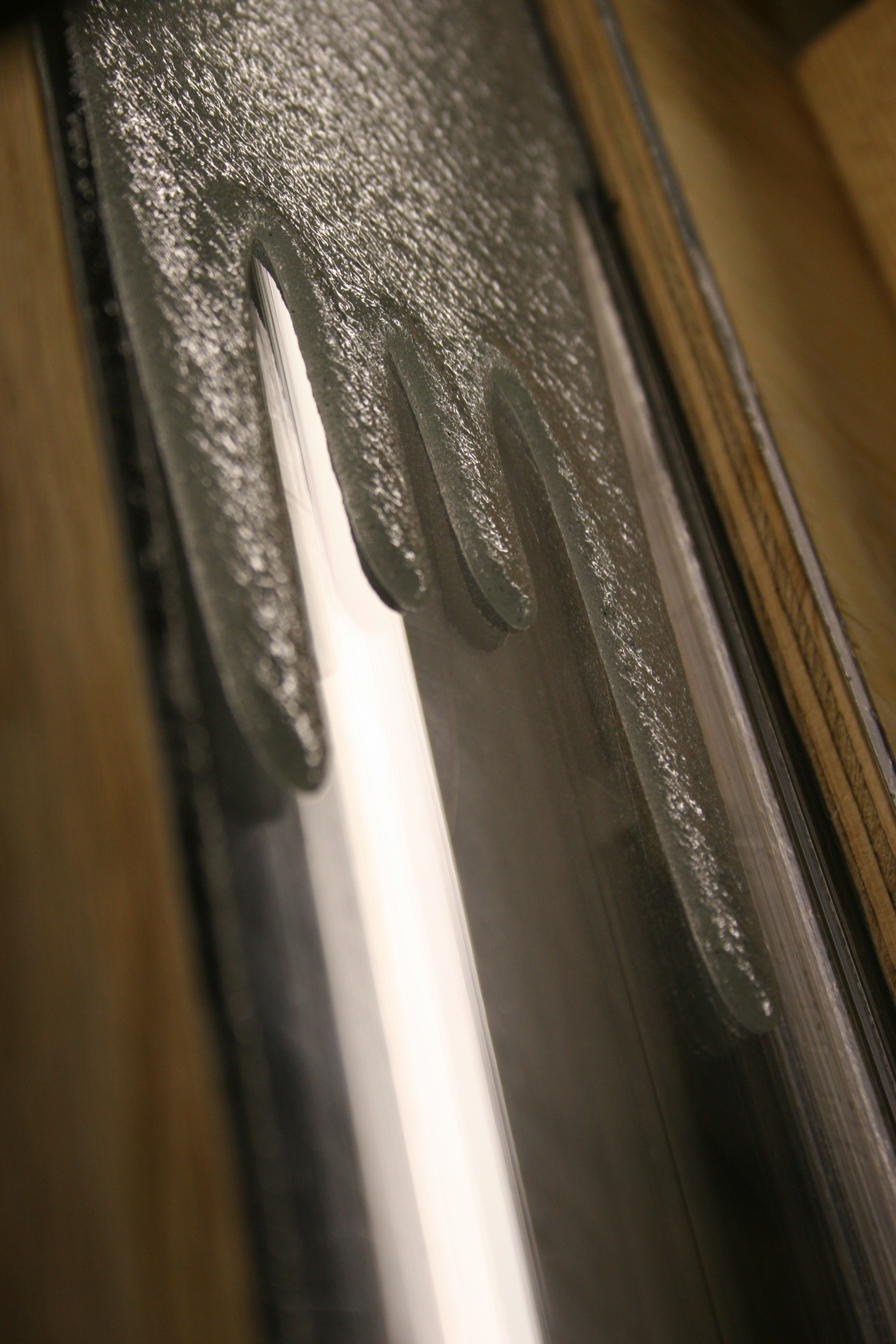
A slurry composed of glass beads in silicone oil flowing down an inclined plane

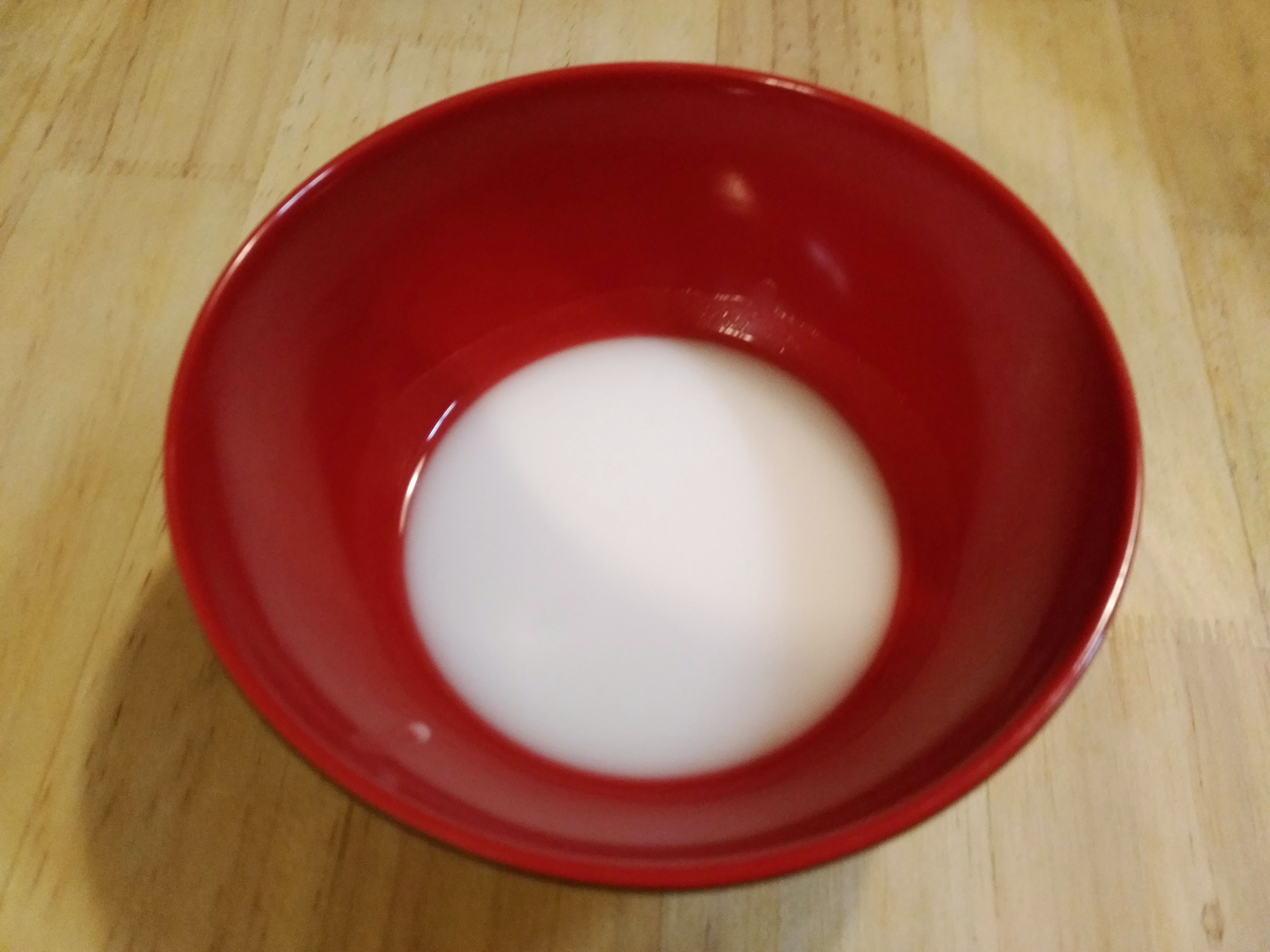
Potato starch slurry

A slurry is a mixture of denser solids suspended in liquid, usually water. The most common use of slurry is as a means of transporting solids or separating minerals, the liquid being a carrier that is pumped on a device such as a centrifugal pump. The size of solid particles may vary from 1 micrometre up to hundreds of millimetres. The particles may settle below a certain transport velocity and the mixture can behave like a Newtonian or non-Newtonian fluid. Depending on the mixture, the slurry may be abrasive and/or corrosive.

== Examples ==
Examples of slurries include:

- Cement slurry, a mixture of cement, water, and assorted dry and liquid additives used in the petroleum and other industries
- Soil/cement slurry, also called Controlled Low-Strength Material (CLSM), flowable fill, controlled density fill, flowable mortar, plastic soil-cement, K-Krete, and other names
- A mixture of thickening agent, oxidizers, and water used to form a gel explosive
- A mixture of pyroclastic material, rocky debris, and water produced in a volcanic eruption and known as a lahar
- A mixture of bentonite and water used to make slurry walls
- Coal slurry, a mixture of coal waste and water, or crushed coal and water
- Slip, a mixture of clay and water used for joining, glazing and decoration of ceramics and pottery.
- Slurry oil, the highest boiling fraction distilled from the effluent of an FCC unit in an oil refinery. It contains a large amount of catalyst, in form of sediments hence the denomination of slurry.
- A mixture of wood pulp and water used to make paper
- Manure slurry, a mixture of animal waste, organic matter, and sometimes water often known simply as "slurry" in agricultural use, used as fertilizer after aging in a slurry pit
- Meat slurry, a mixture of finely ground meat and water, centrifugally dewatered and used as a food ingredient.
- An abrasive substance used in chemical-mechanical polishing
- Slurry ice, a mixture of ice crystals, freezing point depressant, and water
- A mixture of raw materials and water involved in the rawmill manufacture of Portland cement
- A bolus of chewed food mixed with saliva
- A mixture of epoxy glue and glass microspheres used as a filler compound around core materials in sandwich-structured composite airframes.

== Calculations ==
=== Determining solids fraction ===
To determine the percent solids (or solids fraction) of a slurry from the density of the slurry, solids and liquid

$$\phi_{sl}=\frac{\rho_{s}(\rho_{sl} - \rho_{l})}{\rho_{sl}(\rho_{s} - \rho_{l})}$$

where

$\phi_{sl}$ is the solids fraction of the slurry (state by mass)
$\rho_{s}$ is the solids density
$\rho_{sl}$ is the slurry density
$\rho_{l}$ is the liquid density

In aqueous slurries, as is common in mineral processing, the specific gravity of the species is typically used, and since specific gravity of water is taken to be 1, this relation is typically written:

$$\phi_{sl}=\frac{\rho_{s}(\rho_{sl} - 1)}{\rho_{sl}(\rho_{s} - 1)}$$

even though specific gravity with units tonnes/m^{3} (t/m^{3}) is used instead of the SI density unit, kg/m^{3}.

=== Liquid mass from mass fraction of solids ===
To determine the mass of liquid in a sample given the mass of solids and the mass fraction: By definition

$$\phi_{sl}=\frac{M_{s}}{M_{sl}}$$

therefore

$$M_{sl}=\frac{M_{s}}{\phi_{sl}}$$

and

$$M_{s}+M_{l}=\frac{M_{s}}{\phi_{sl}}$$

then

$$M_{l}=\frac{M_{s}}{\phi_{sl}}-M_{s}$$

and therefore

$$M_{l}=\frac{1-\phi_{sl}}{\phi_{sl}}M_{s}$$

where

$\phi_{sl}$ is the solids fraction of the slurry
$M_{s}$ is the mass or mass flow of solids in the sample or stream
$M_{sl}$ is the mass or mass flow of slurry in the sample or stream
$M_{l}$ is the mass or mass flow of liquid in the sample or stream

=== Volumetric fraction from mass fraction ===
$$\phi_{sl,m}=\frac{M_{s}}{M_{sl}}$$

Equivalently

$$\phi_{sl,v}=\frac{V_{s}}{V_{sl}}$$

and in a minerals processing context where the specific gravity of the liquid (water) is taken to be one:

$$\phi_{sl,v}=\frac{\frac{M_{s}}{SG_{s}}}{\frac{M_{s}}{SG_{s}}+\frac{M_{l}}{1}}$$

So

$$\phi_{sl,v}=\frac{M_{s}}{M_{s}+M_{l}SG_{s}}$$

and

$$\phi_{sl,v}=\frac{1}{1+\frac{M_{l}SG_{s}}{M_{s}}}$$

Then combining with the first equation:

$$\phi_{sl,v}=\frac{1}{1+\frac{M_{l}SG_{s}}{\phi_{sl,m}M_{s}}\frac{M_{s}}{M_{s}+M_{l}}}$$

So

$$\phi_{sl,v}=\frac{1}{1+\frac{SG_{s}}{\phi_{sl,m}}\frac{M_{l}}{M_{s}+M_{l}}}$$

Then since

$$\phi_{sl,m}=\frac{M_{s}}{M_{s}+M_{l}}=1-\frac{M_{l}}{M_{s}+M_{l}}$$

we conclude that

$$\phi_{sl,v}=\frac{1}{1+SG_{s}(\frac{1}{\phi_{sl,m}}-1)}$$

where

$\phi_{sl,v}$ is the solids fraction of the slurry on a volumetric basis
$\phi_{sl,m}$ is the solids fraction of the slurry on a mass basis
$M_{s}$ is the mass or mass flow of solids in the sample or stream
$M_{sl}$ is the mass or mass flow of slurry in the sample or stream
$M_{l}$ is the mass or mass flow of liquid in the sample or stream
$SG_{s}$ is the bulk specific gravity of the solids

== See also ==
- Grout
- Slurry pipeline
- Slurry transport
- Slurry wall
