= Lao Genevra Simons =

American mathematician, writer

- Born: 25 March 1870; San Jose, California, United States
- Died: 25 November 1949 (aged 79); Greenwich, Connecticut, United States
- Education: Columbia University
- Known for: Author of Fabre and Mathematics and Other Essays
- Scientific career
- Fields: Mathematics, history of science
- Workplaces: Hunter College

Lao Genevra Simons (1870–1949) also referred to as Lao G. Simons, was an American mathematician, writer, and historian of mathematics known for her influential book Fabre and Mathematics and Other Essays. Simons was head of the mathematics department at Hunter College in New York.

== Life ==
Lao Genevra Simons was born on March 25, 1870, in San Jose, California. When Simons was six months old, her family moved east to New Jersey.

Upon retiring from Hunter College, Simons founded a $1000 scholarship for the university named after the mathematics honour society, Pi Mu Epsilon. A second graduate scholarship was created in her name, funded by friends, alumnae, and admirers, in the same year.

Simons died on November 25, 1949, in Greenwich, Connecticut, at age 79 of natural causes.

=== Education ===
As a child, Simons attended school in New Jersey. She later obtained a teaching certificate from the College for the Training of Teachers at Columbia University and later studied astronomy and mathematics for a year at Vassar College.

Simons earned a bachelor of science in 1908 from Columbia University; she attained a master’s degree and a Ph.D. also from Columbia in 1912 and 1924 respectively. Her Ph.D. was obtained with a major in education and a minor in mathematics. Simons' doctoral thesis was entitled Introduction of algebra into American schools in the eighteenth century.

== Career ==
After obtaining her teaching certificate she taught at a preparatory school in Connecticut, then taught elementary school for a year in South Orange, New Jersey.

Simons was hired at a mathematics professor at Hunter College in 1895. This appointment did not require a bachelor's degree, which Simons did not have at the time of her initial hiring. In 1916, she became an assistant professor and in 1925, she became an associate professor. Simons would later be promoted to professor and head of the mathematics department at Hunter College in 1928.

At Hunter College, Simons was Chairman of Student Activities from 1934, when the committee was initially founded, until 1940. Simons taught elective courses in mathematics, including advanced classes in pure mathematics and classes in the history of mathematics, in addition to required classes; Simons was one of the first mathematics professors at Hunter to do so. Simons worked at Hunter College until her retirement in 1940.

Simons was elected a member of the American Mathematical Society in September 1923. Simons was also a member of the Council of The History of Science Society. As part of the Council, Simons was part of the committee on arrangements for the meeting and exhibition commemorating the bi-centenary of the death of Sir Isaac Newton.

Simons wrote articles about math history for Scripta Mathematica, The Mathematics Teacher, and the American Mathematical Monthly. Simons was an associate editor for Scripta Mathematica, and from 1932, the founding year of the journal, to 1949 she served as its Book Review Editor.

== Works ==
- Introduction of algebra into American schools in the eighteenth century (1924), doctoral thesis
  - Simons said of this publication that its purpose was "to show that algebra entered into the American education of the eighteenth century, and to show further that we must seek some other reason for its presence than a practical need for it."
- “Algebra at Harvard College in 1730” (1925) in The American Mathematical Monthly, Vol. 32, No. 2, pp. 63–70
- Bibliography of Early American Textbooks on Algebra (1936)
  - A summary and description of America algebra textbooks published through 1850
- Fabre and Mathematics and Other Essays (1939)
  - The book contained three previously published essays: "Fabre and Mathematics", "The Influence of French Mathematicians at the End of the Eighteenth Century upon the Teaching of Mathematics in American Colleges", and "Short Stories in Colonial Geometry"
  - The only new essay published in Fabre and Mathematics was "The Interest of Alexander von Humboldt in Mathematics"
