= Number: The Language of Science =

1930 popular mathematics book by Tobias Dantzig

Number: The Language of Science: A Critical Survey Written for the Cultured Non-Mathematician
- Title page for Number: The Language of Science: A Critical Survey Written for the Cultured Non-Mathematician (1945 Third edition)
- Author: Tobias Dantzig
- Language: English
- Genre: Mathematics
- Publisher: Macmillan Publishing
- Publication date: 1930
- Publication place: United States

Number: The Language of Science: A Critical Survey Written for the Cultured Non-Mathematician is a popular mathematics book by Tobias Dantzig. The original U.S. publication was by Macmillan in 1930. A second edition (third impression) was published in 1947 in Prague by Melantrich Company. The book recounts the history of mathematical ideas.

== Chapters ==
The book has 12 chapters. There is an appendix of illustrations. The third edition contains a separate section for essays, at the book's end.

1. Fingerprints
2. The Empty Column
3. Number Lore
4. The Last Number
5. Symbols
6. The Unutterable
7. This Flowing World
8. The Act of Becoming
9. Filling the Gaps
10. The Domain of Number
11. The Anatomy of the Infinite
12. The Two Realities
