= Georges Ifrah =

French author and mathematician

Georges Ifrah (1947 – 1 November 2019) was a teacher of mathematics, a French author and a self-taught historian of mathematics, especially numerals.

His work, From One to Zero: A Universal History of Numbers (1985, 1994) was translated into multiple languages, became an international bestseller, and was included in American Scientist's list of "100 or so Books that shaped a Century of Science", referring to the 20th century. Despite popular acclaim, it has been broadly criticized by scholars.

== Publications ==
Several books devoted to numbers and history of numbers and number related topics including:

- 1981: Histoire Universelle des Chiffres (Paris)
  - English translation (1985): From one to zero. A universal history of numbers transl. by Lowell Bair. New York: Viking Penguin Inc. XVI, 503 pages. (Zentralblatt review: 0589.01001: "It is the richness in documents from both primitive and advanced cultures, which makes this publication unique.[…]a number of authors mentioned in the text are not cited in this bibliography. And in many cases the sources of illustrations remain anonymous".)
  - German translation (1986): Universalgeschichte der Zahlen transl. by Alexander von Platen. Frankfurt/New York: Campus Verlag. 580 pages. (Zentralblatt review 0606.01023.)
  - German translation (1989): Universalgeschichte der Zahlen. 600 pages. (Additional introduction and indices.) (Zentralblatt review: 0686.01001.)
  - Italian translation (1983): Storia universale dei numeri. Milano: Mondadori. 585 pages.
- 1985: Les chiffres ou l'histoire d'une grande invention Robert Laffont
  - "The history of numbers or the history of a great discovery" (abridged version? ≈260 pages)
  - Polish translation (1990): Dzieje liczby czyli historia wielkiego wynalazku translated by Stanisław Hartman. Wrocław: Zakład Narodowy im. Ossolińskich-Wydawnictwo Polskiej Akademii Nauk (Ossolineum). 260 pages. ISBN 83-04-03218-X. (Zentralblatt review: 0758.01017.)
- 1994: Histoire universelle des chiffres, 2nd edition. (Seghers, puis Bouquins, Robert Laffont, 1994)
  - Now in two volumes: Vol I 633 pages ISBN 0-471-37568-3 (Zentralblatt review: 0955.01002), Vol II 412 pages ISBN 0-471-39671-0 (Zentralblatt review: 0969.68001).
  - Norwegian translation (1997): All verdens tall. Tallenes kulturhistorie. I, II. Translated by Anne Falken, Guri Haarr, Margrethe Kvarenes and Svanhild Solløs. Oslo: Pax Forlag. 1284 p. (1997). ISBN 82-530-1887-8 (set); ISBN 82-530-1897-5(vol.1); ISBN 82-530-1898-3 (vol.2). (Zentralblatt review: 0933.01001)
  - English translation (1998): Universal History of Numbers: From Prehistory to the Invention of the Computer. Translated by David Bellos, E.F. Harding, Sophie Wood and Ian Monk. Harville Press, London, 1998 (ISBN 978-1860463242).
    - American edition of English tr., Volume 1 (2000): The Universal History of Numbers: From prehistory to the invention of the computer. Translated by David Bellos, E.F. Harding, Sophie Wood and Ian Monk. John Wiley and Sons Inc., 2000.
    - American edition of English tr, Volume 2 (2001): The Universal History of Computing: From the Abacus to the Quantum Computer with E. F. Harding. John Wiley & Sons Inc, 2001, ISBN 0-471-44147-3 (softcover) and ISBN 0-471-39671-0 (hardcover).
    - Italian translation (2008): Enciclopedia universale dei numeri. Milano: Mondadori. 1627 pages, ISBN 978-88-04-58333-2 translated by Paolo Frassi, Daniela Nicolò, Adriana Pancaro Silvestri, Luciano Revelli.
