= Tobias Dantzig =

Russian-American mathematician and author (1884–1956)

Tobias Dantzig (/ˈdæntsɪɡ/; February 19, 1884 – August 9, 1956) was a Russian-American mathematician, the father of George Dantzig, and the author of Number: The Language of Science (A critical survey written for the cultured non-mathematician) (1930) and Aspects of Science (New York, Macmillan, 1937).

== Biography ==
Born in Shavli (then Imperial Russia, now Lithuania) into the family of Shmuel Dantzig (?-1940) and Guta Dimant (1863–1917), he grew up in Łódź and studied mathematics with Henri Poincaré in Paris. His brother Jacob (1891-1942) was murdered by the Nazis during the Holocaust; he also had a brother Naftali (who lived in Moscow) and sister Emma.

Tobias married a fellow Sorbonne University student, Anja Ourisson, and the couple emigrated to the United States in 1910. He worked for a time as a lumberjack, road worker, and house painter in Oregon, until returning to academia at the encouragement of Reed College mathematician Frank Griffin. Dantzig received his Ph.D. in mathematics from Indiana University Bloomington in 1917, while working as a professor there. He later taught at Johns Hopkins University, Columbia University, and the University of Maryland, College Park.

Dantzig died in Los Angeles in 1956. He was the father of George Dantzig, a key figure in the development of linear programming.

== Partial list of publications ==
- Number: The Language of Science (1930); reprint of 4th edition. Penguin. 2007. ISBN 9780452288119.
- Aspects of Science (1937)
- The Story of Geometry (1940)
- Henri Poincaré, Critic of Crisis: Reflections on His Universe of Discourse (1954)
- The Bequest of the Greeks (1955); Dantzig, Tobias (2006). Dover reprint. Courier Corporation. ISBN 9780486453477.
