= Concrete pump =

Machine used for transferring liquid concrete by pumping

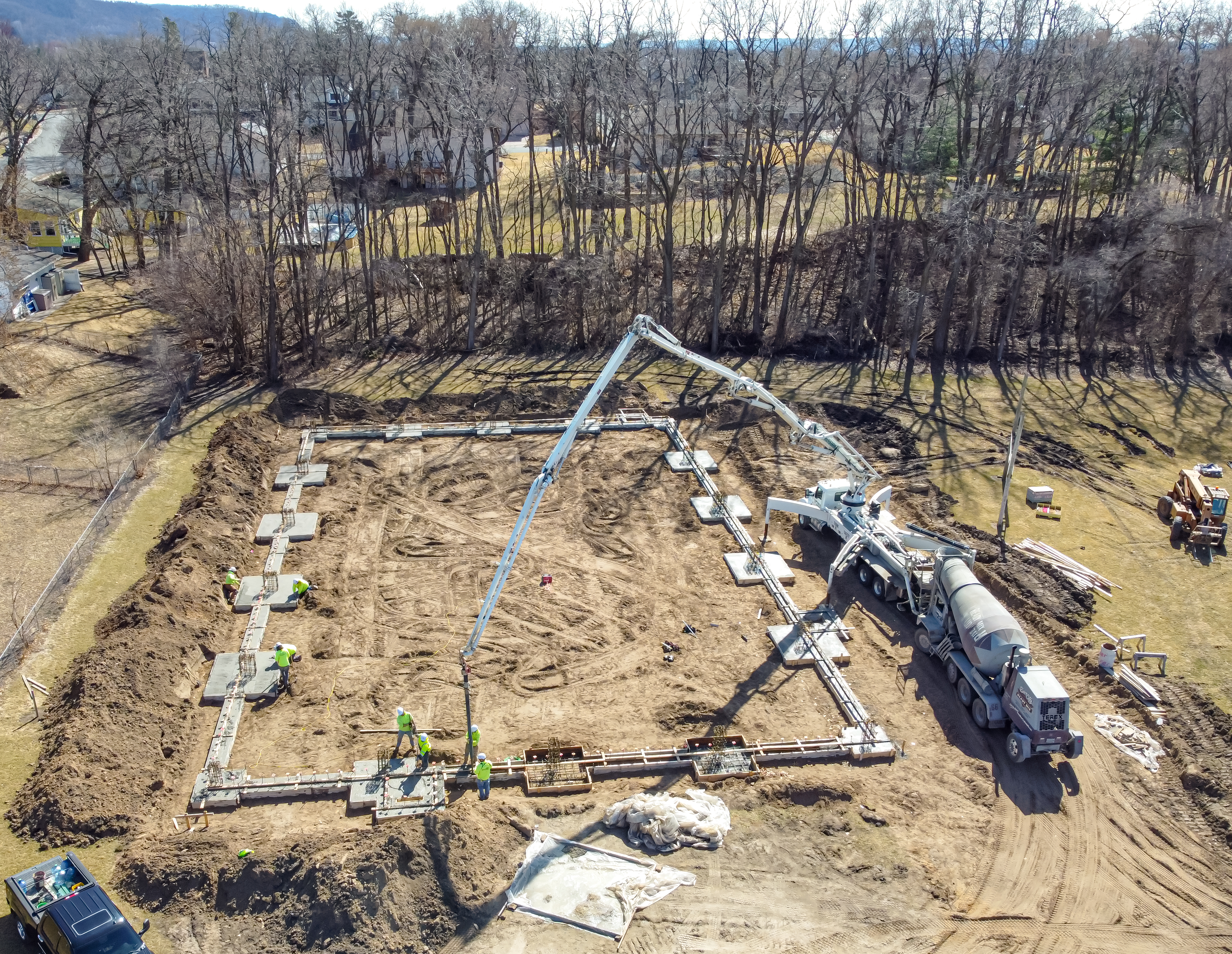
Concrete pump boom being fed by a concrete mixer truck

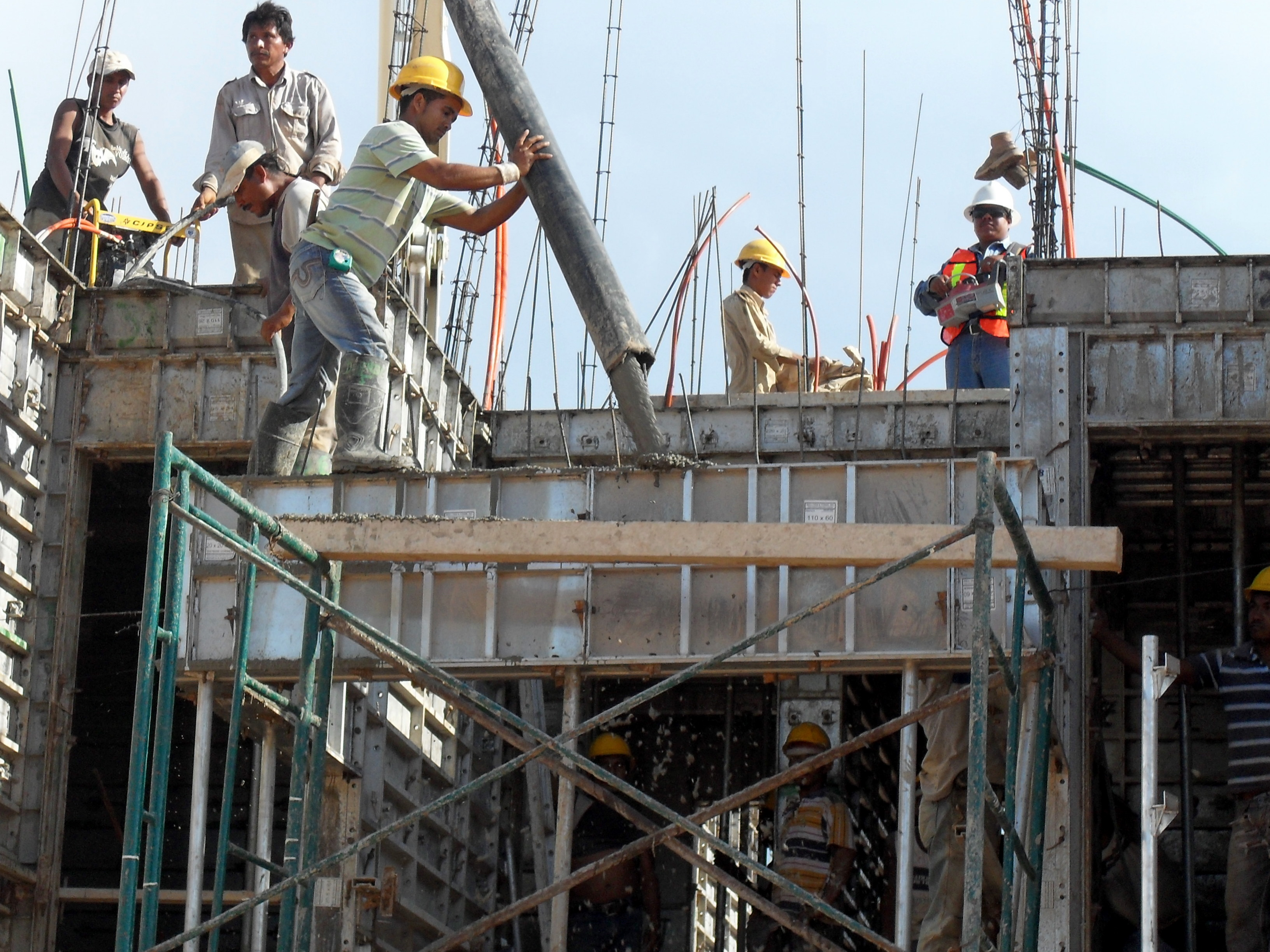
Pumping concrete into aluminium concrete formwork in Mexico.

A concrete pump is a machine used for transferring liquid concrete by pumping. There are different types of concrete pumps.

A common type of concrete pump for large scale construction projects is known as a boom concrete pump, because it uses a remote-controlled articulating robotic arm (called a boom) to place concrete accurately. It is attached to a truck or a semi-trailer. Boom pumps are capable of pumping at very high volumes and are less labor intensive to operate when compared to line or other types of concrete pumps.

The second main type of concrete pump uses hoses and is commonly referred to as a "line pump" or a "grout pump," depending on the size of the aggregate being pumped. Both a line pump and a grout pump is either mounted on a truck or placed on a trailer.

This pump requires steel or flexible concrete placing hoses to be manually attached to the outlet of the machine and feed the concrete to the place of application. The length of the hoses varies, typical hose lengths are 3.0, 3.8, 7.6, and 15.2 metres (10, 12.5, 25, and 50 ft), depending on the diameter of the rock in the concrete. Line pumps can handle aggregate of 3/4" diameter while grout pumps are designed only for 3/8" or pea gravel size rock. Hose pumps are used for smaller volume concrete placing applications such as swimming pools, sidewalks, single family home concrete slabs and most ground slabs. Their hoses allow for easier delivery to harder to reach backyards, etc.

There are also skid mounted and rail mounted concrete pumps, but these are uncommon and only used on specialized jobsites such as mines and tunnels.

== History ==
Until the early 20th century, concrete was mixed on the job site and transported from the cement mixer to the formwork, either in wheelbarrows or in buckets lifted by cranes. This required a lot of time and labor. In 1927, the German engineers Max Giese and Fritz Hull came upon the idea of pumping concrete through pipes. They pumped concrete to a height of 38 meters (125 ft) and a distance of 120 meters (130 yd). Shortly after, a concrete pump was patented in Holland in 1932 by Jacob Cornelius Kweimn (Jacobus Cornelius Kooijman). This patent incorporated the developer's previous German patent.

== Mechanism ==
Concrete pump designers face many challenges because concrete is heavy, viscous, abrasive, contains pieces of hard rock, and solidifies if not kept moving.

Operating principle of piston pump with seat valves

Usually, piston pumps are used, because they can produce hundreds of atmospheres of pressure. Such piston-style pumps can push cylinders of heterogenous concrete mixes (aggregate + cement). At present, double-piston pumps are predominantly used, which are hydraulically driven by electric or diesel engines using oil pumps. The pressure pistons are hydraulically connected to each other through the drive cylinders and operate in a two-stroke mode.

For lower pressures peristaltic pumps are common.

=== How it works ===
The return pressure piston of one pressure cylinder creates a vacuum, the medium from the feed funnel is sucked into the cylinder. At the same time, the advancing delivery piston pushes the contents of the other delivery cylinder through the transfer tube into the delivery line. At the end of the stroke, the pump switches, i.e., the transfer tube turns in front of the other filled pressure cylinders, and the pressure pistons change their movement direction.

Concrete pump drives are now exclusively hydraulic, so control options vary between individual manufacturers. Each system has certain advantages and disadvantages.

Important performance factors are:

- discharge pressure
- machine weight
- price
- system complexity

For these reasons, many options have existed side by side for a long time. Nowadays, fluid pressures of up to 400 bar (5,800 psi) and flow rates of up to 200 m^{3}/h (260 yd^{3}/h) can be achieved, while using piston-type pumps.

== Example of pump performance ==
To illustrate, below are data on a typical concrete sample pump BRF 42.14 H:

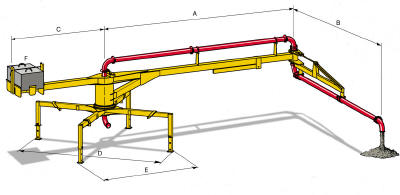
BRF 42.14 H pump

- Vertical reach of boom: 41.9 meters (137 ft)
- Horizontal reach of boom: 38.0 meters (124.7 ft)
- Pumping rate: 30 m^{3}/h (39 yd^{3}/h)
- Concrete pressure: 112 bar (11,200 kPa; 1,624 psi)
- Cylinder length: 2,100 mm (83 in)
- Cylinder diameter: 210 mm (8.3 in)
- Number of substitutions of strokes per minute: 27
- Number of outrigger legs: 4

== Gallery ==
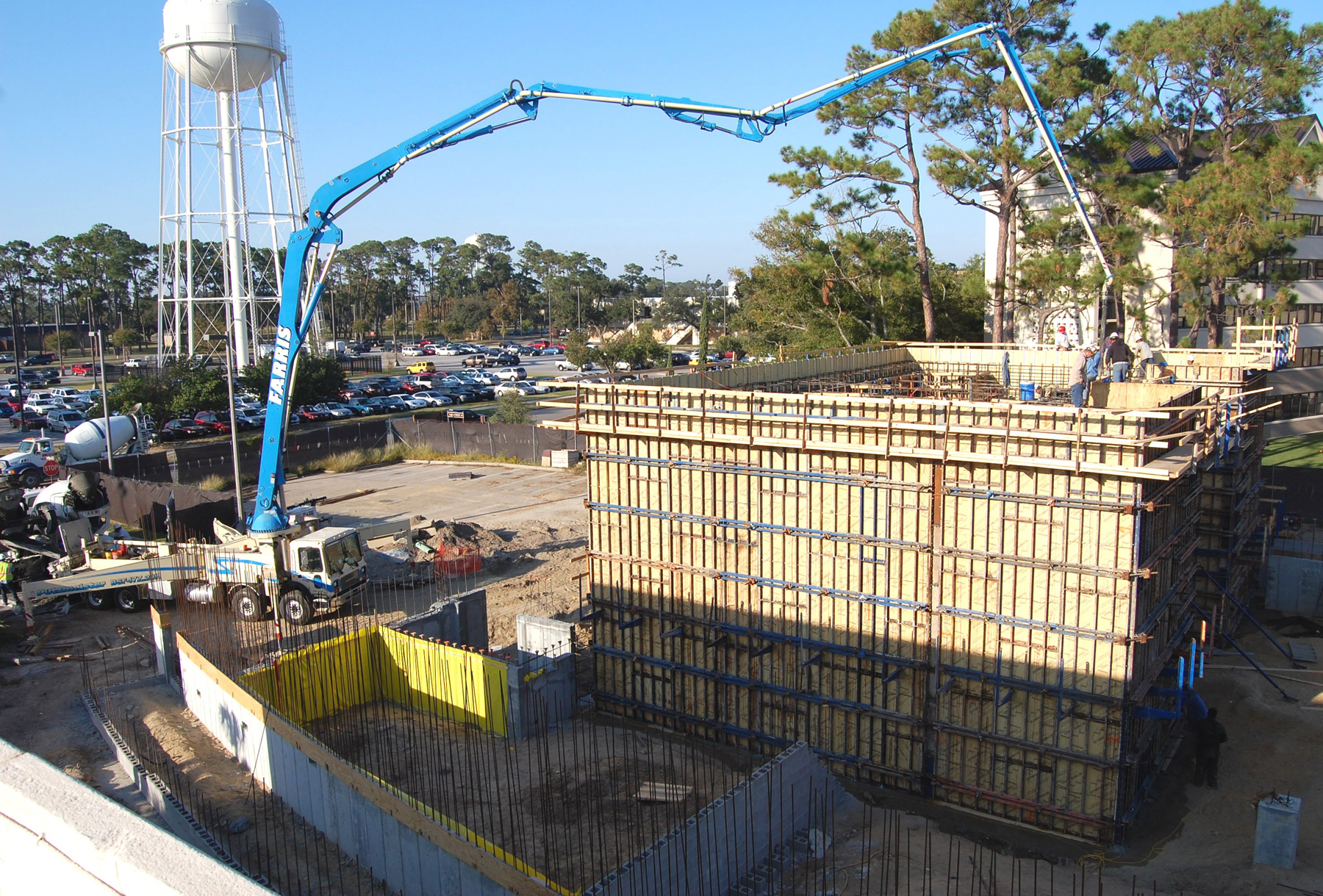
Construction site with concrete pump

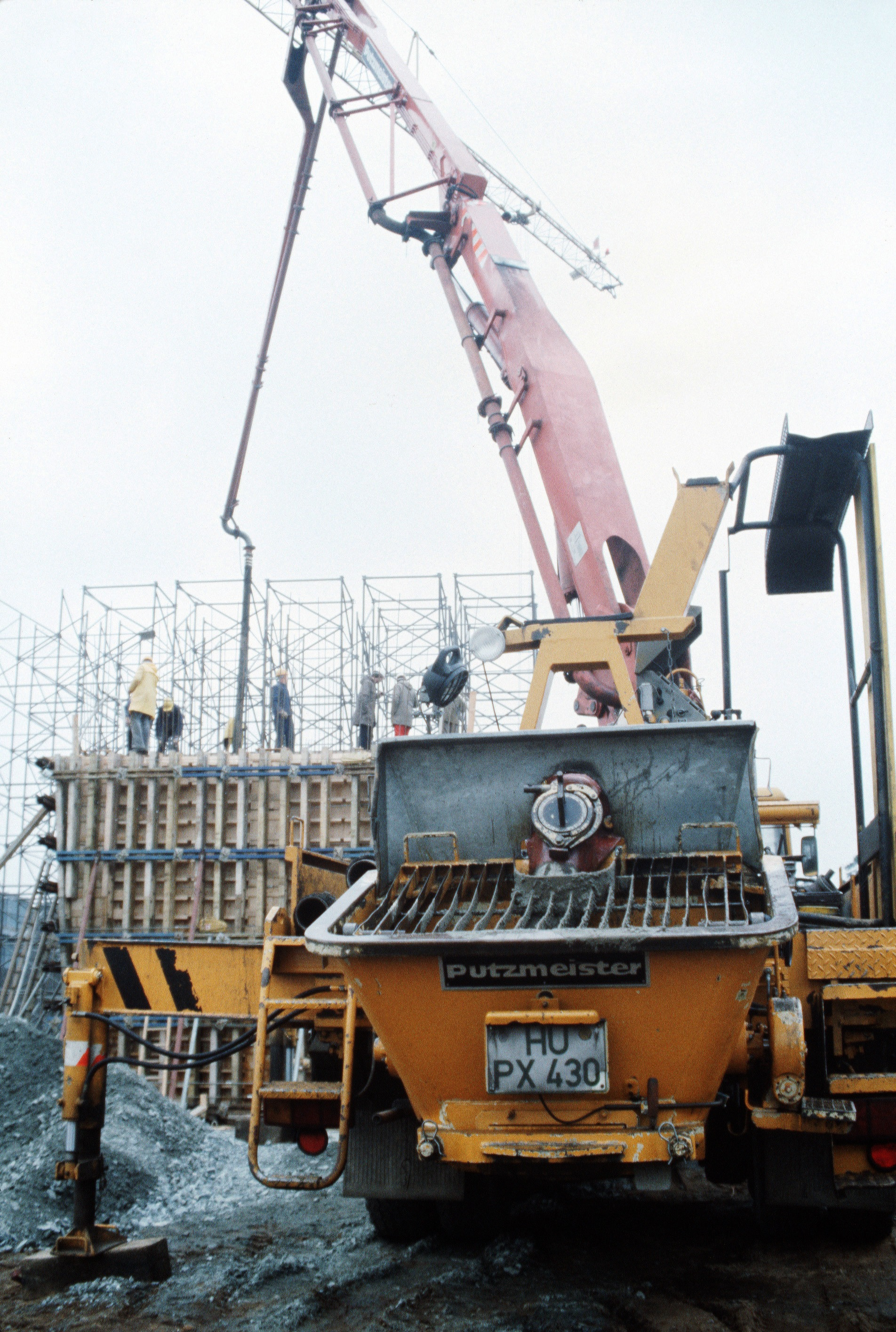
A Putzmeister concrete pump in Germany in 1985

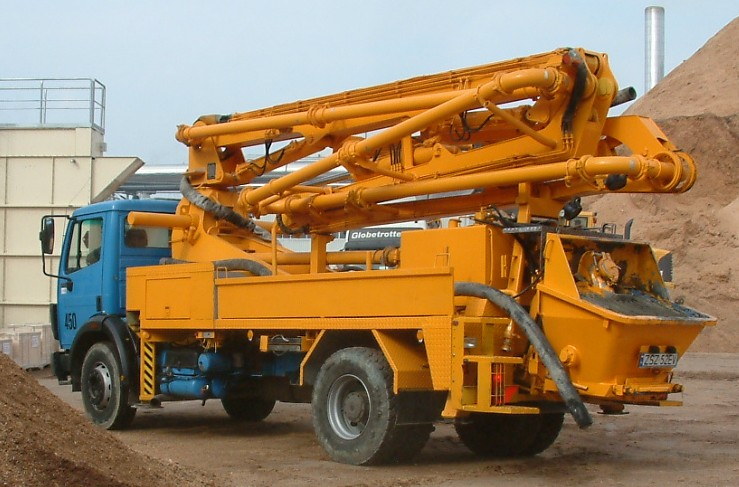
Concrete pump folded for transport

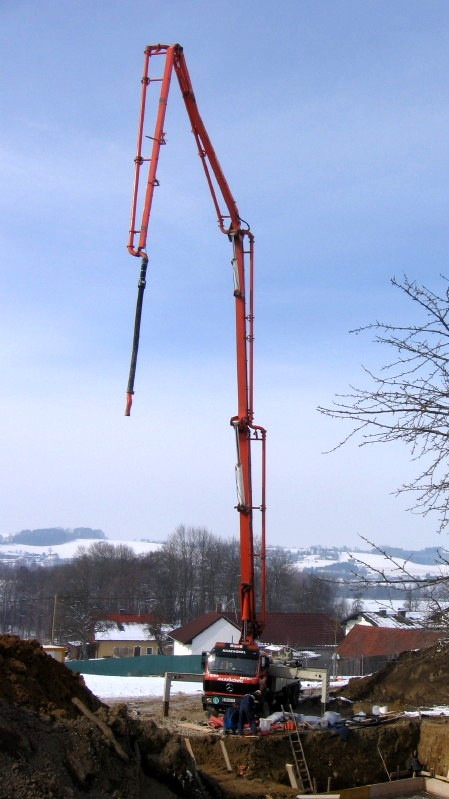
Boom concrete pump

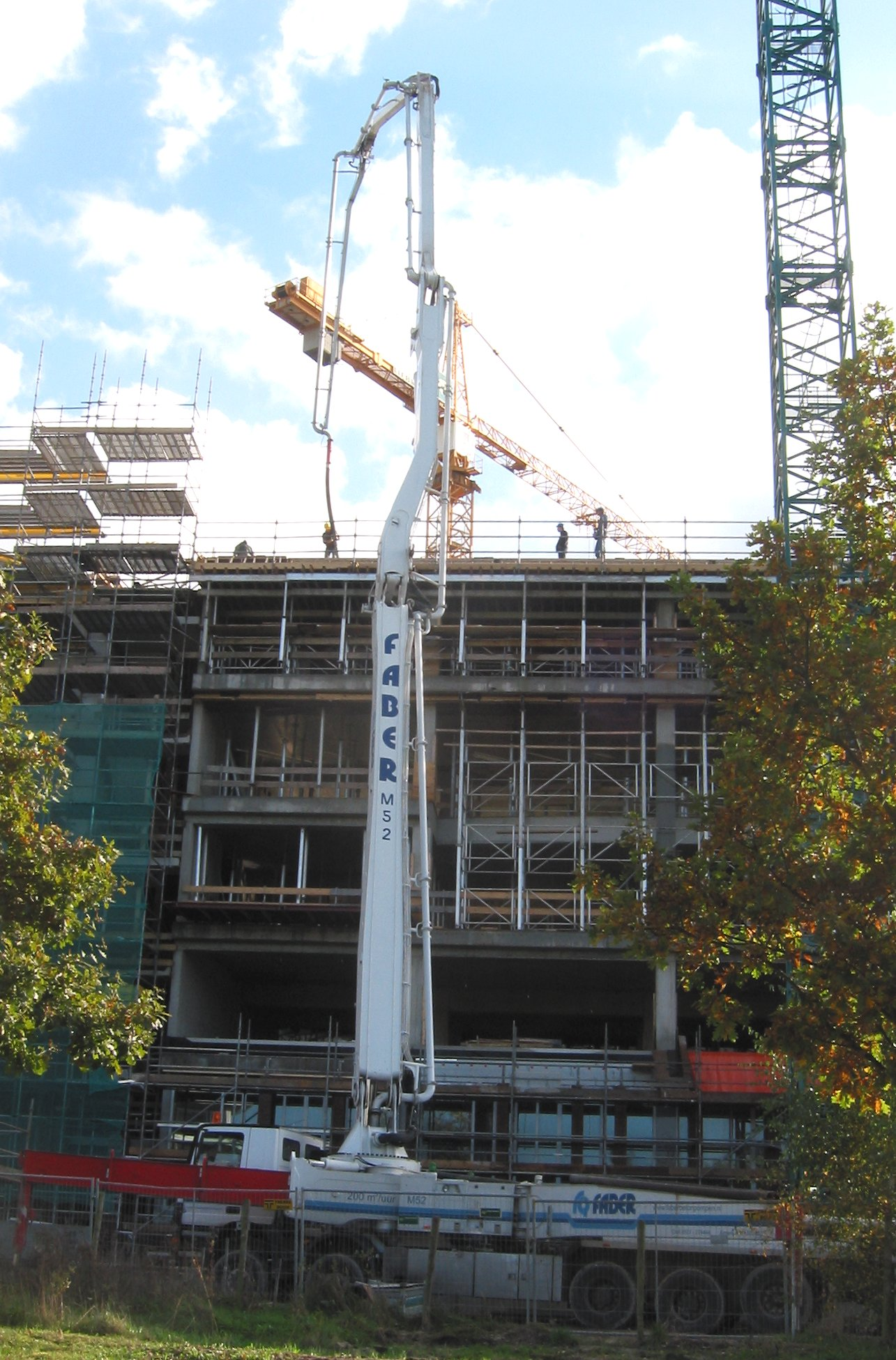
Concrete pump

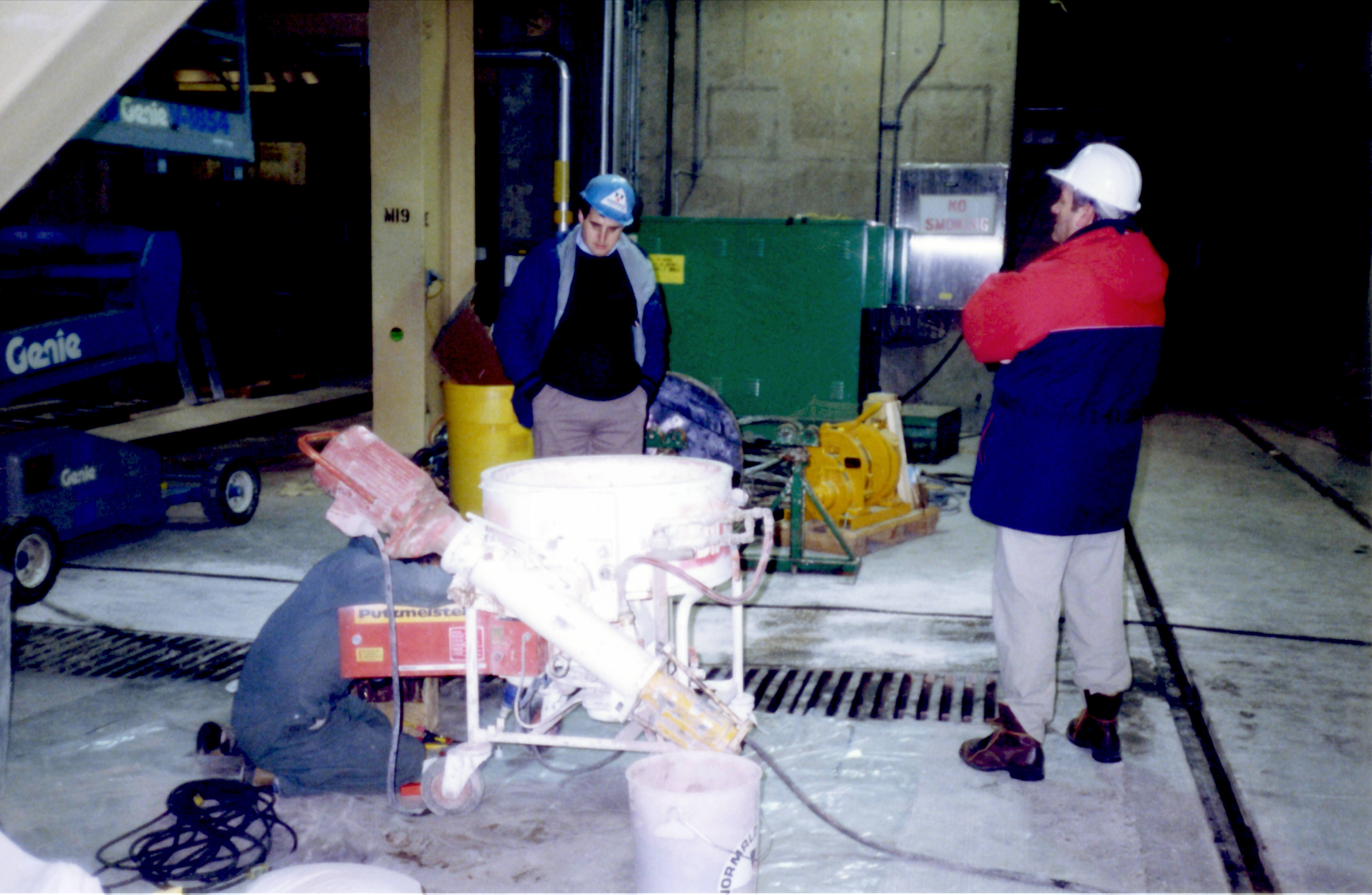
Putzmeister brand positive displacement mortar and plaster pump

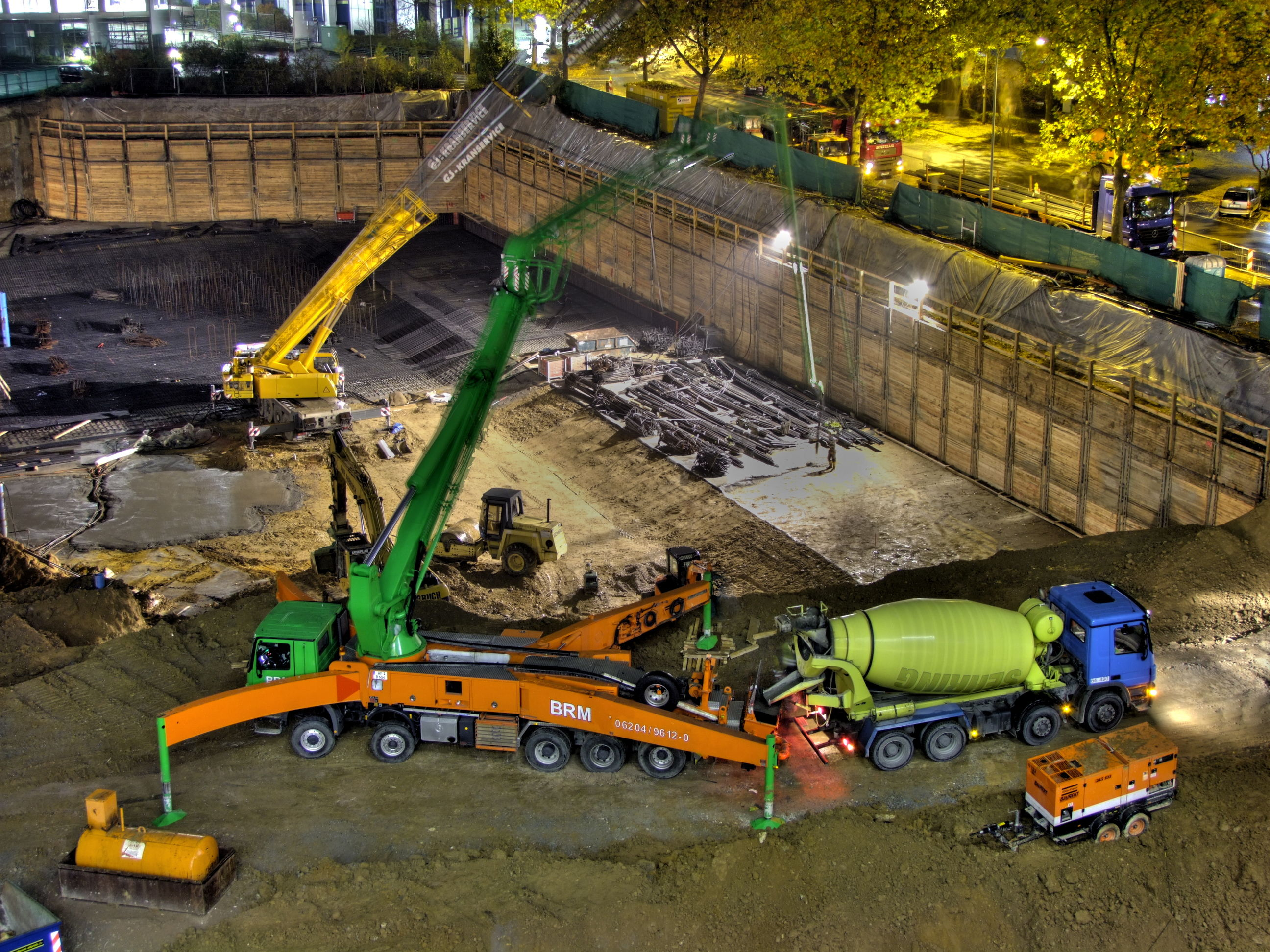
Photo showing a concrete pump working a large foundation pour, showing deployed outriggers, rebar mats, and concrete mixer delivering concrete.

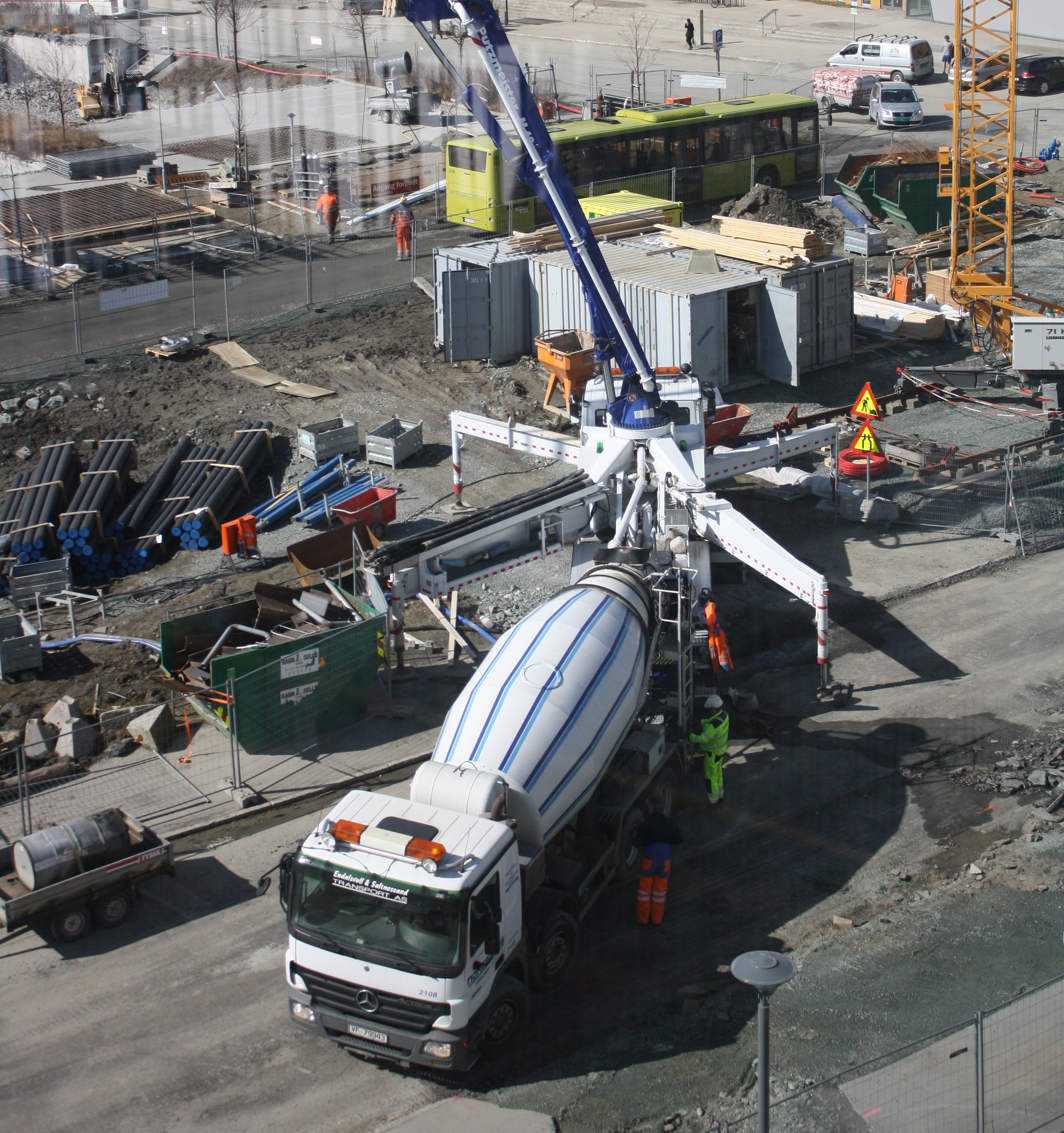
Fully deployed concrete pump, showing outriggers and boom in use while receiving concrete.

== See also ==
- High-density solids pump - concrete pump technology in general
- Concrete mixing transport trucks
