= Max Giese =

German engineer and inventor

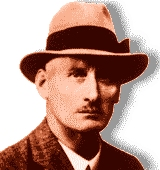
- Portrait of Max Giese
- Born: 1879; Sigmaringen, Province of Hohenzollern, Prussia, German Empire
- Died: 1935 (aged 55–56); Kassel, Hesse, Germany
- Occupations: Engineer, inventor

Max Giese (1879 – 1935) was a German engineer and inventor.

== Life ==
In 1927, the disadvantages of using a conventional pouring tower led engineers Max Giese and Fritz Hell to the idea of pumping concrete from a concrete mixer directly to the point of use. In 1928, Giese invented the concrete pump. The reduced water content in the concrete during the pumping process not only saves energy but also allows the material to harden faster and stronger. Gravel or crushed stone were used. It was possible to pump to a height of 38 meters and at a distance of 120 meters.

In Kiel Max Giese started his own company Max Giese Bau GmbH.
