= Fernando Q. Gouvêa =

Brazilian American mathematician

Fernando Quadros Gouvêa is a Brazilian number theorist and historian of mathematics. He is the Carter Professor of Mathematics at Colby College in Waterville, Maine. He won the Lester R. Ford Award of the Mathematical Association of America (MAA) in 1995 for his exposition of Wiles's proof of Fermat's Last Theorem. He also won the Beckenbach Book Prize of the MAA in 2007 for his book with William P. Berlinghoff, Math through the Ages: A Gentle History for Teachers and Others (Oxton House, 2002; 2nd ed., 2014).

Gouvêa grew up in São Paulo, the son of a lawyer and banker, and was educated there in an English-language primary school and then at the Colégio Bandeirantes de São Paulo. He earned a bachelor's degree from the University of São Paulo, and then a master's degree in 1981 under the supervision of César Polcino Milies. He moved to Harvard University in 1983 for continuing graduate study in number theory, and completed his doctorate there in 1987; his dissertation, titled Arithmetic of p-adic Modular Forms, was supervised by Barry Mazur.

He became a faculty member at the University of São Paulo, took a visiting position at Queen's University in Kingston, Ontario in 1990, and was brought to Colby College by Keith Devlin, who had recently been hired as department chair there.

He is the editor of the Carus Mathematical Monographs book series, and of MAA Reviews, an online book review service published by the MAA.
