= Florian Cajori =

Swiss-American historian of mathematics

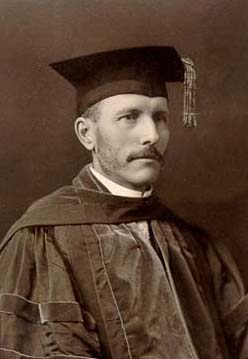
- Florian Cajori at Colorado College
- Born: 28 February 1859; St. Aignan near Thusis, Graubünden, Switzerland
- Died: 14 August 1930 (aged 71); Berkeley, United States
- Scientific career
- Fields: History of mathematics

Florian Cajori (February 28, 1859 – August 14 or 15, 1930) was a Swiss-American historian of mathematics, especially known for his comprehensive treatise about mathematical notation, A History of Mathematical Notations.

== Biography ==
Florian Cajori was born in Zillis, Switzerland, as the son of Georg Cajori and Catherine Camenisch. He attended schools first in Zillis and later in Chur. In 1875, Florian Cajori emigrated to the United States at the age of sixteen, and attended the State Normal school in Whitewater, Wisconsin. After graduating in 1878, he taught in a country school, and later began studying mathematics at University of Wisconsin–Madison.

In 1883, Cajori received both his bachelor's and master's degrees from the University of Wisconsin–Madison, briefly attended Johns Hopkins University for 8 months in between degrees. He taught for a few years at Tulane University, before being appointed as professor of applied mathematics there in 1887. He was then driven north by tuberculosis. He founded the Colorado College Scientific Society and taught at Colorado College where he held the chair in physics from 1889 to 1898 and the chair in mathematics from 1898 to 1918. He was the position Dean of the engineering department. While at Colorado, he received his doctorate from Tulane in 1894, and married Elizabeth G. Edwards in 1890 and had one son.

Cajori's A History of Mathematics (1894) was the first popular presentation of the history of mathematics in the United States. Based upon his reputation in the history of mathematics (even today his 1928–1929 History of Mathematical Notations has been described as "unsurpassed") he was appointed in 1918 to the first history of mathematics chair in the U.S., created especially for him, at the University of California, Berkeley. He remained in Berkeley, California until his death in 1930. Cajori did no original mathematical research unrelated to the history of mathematics. In addition to his numerous books, he also contributed highly recognized and popular historical articles to the American Mathematical Monthly. His last work was a revision of Andrew Motte's 1729 translation of Newton's Principia, vol.1 The Motion of Bodies, but he died before it was completed. The work was finished by R.T. Crawford of Berkeley, California.

== Societies and honors ==
- 1917–1918, Mathematical Association of America president
- 1923, American Association for the Advancement of Science vice-president
- 1924, Invited Speaker of the International Congress of Mathematicians in 1924 in Toronto
- 1924–1925, History of Science Society vice-president
- 1929–1930, Comité International d'Histoire des Sciences vice-president
- The Cajori crater on the Moon was named in his honour

== Publications ==
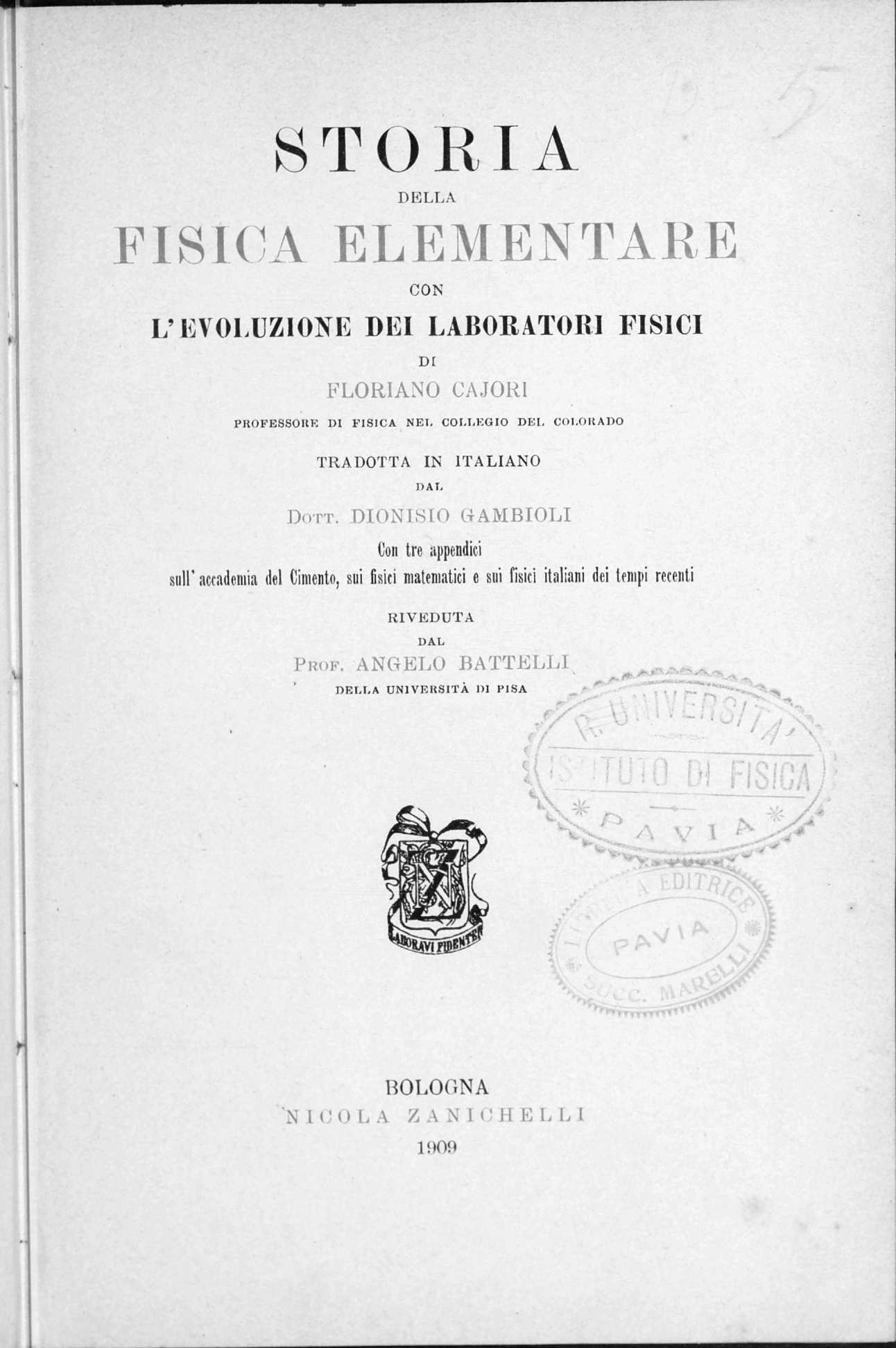
Italian edition of History of physics in its elementary branches including the evolution of physical laboratories, 1909

=== Books ===
- 1890: The Teaching and History of Mathematics in the United States U.S. Government Printing Office.
- 1893: A History of Mathematics, Macmillan & Company.
- 1898: A History of Elementary Mathematics, Macmillan.
- 1899: A History of Physics in its Elementary Branches: Including the Evolution of Physical Laboratories, The Macmillan Company, 1899.
  - A History of Physics in its Elementary Branches: Including the Evolution of Physical Laboratories, The Macmillan Company, 1917.
  - Storia della fisica elementare con l'evoluzione dei laboratori fisici (in Italian). Bologna: Nicola Zanichelli. 1909.
- 1909: A History of the Logarithmic Slide Rule and Allied Instruments The Engineering News Publishing Company.
- 1916: William Oughtred: a Great Seventeenth-century Teacher of Mathematics The Open Court Publishing Company
- 1919: A History of the Conceptions of Limits and Fluxions in Great Britain, from Newton to Woodhouse, Open Court Publishing Company.
- 1920: On the History of Gunter's Scale and the Slide Rule during the Seventeenth Century Vol. 1, University of California Press.
- 1928: A History of Mathematical Notations The Open Court Company.
- 1934: Sir Isaac Newton's Mathematical Principles of Natural Philosophy and His System of the World tr. Andrew Motte, rev. Florian Cajori. Berkeley: University of California Press.

=== Articles ===
- 1913: "History of the Exponential and Logarithmic Concepts", American Mathematical Monthly 20:
  - Page 5 From Napier to Leibniz and John Bernoulli I, 1614 — 1712
  - Page 35 The Modern Exponential Notation (continued)
  - Page 75 : The Creation of a Theory of Logarithms of Complex Numbers by Euler, 1747 — 1749
  - Page 107 : From Euler to Wessel and Argand, 1749 — 1800, Barren discussion.
  - Page 148: Generalizations and refinements effected during the nineteenth century : Graphic representation
  - Page 173: Generalizations and refinements effected during the nineteenth century (2)
  - Page 205: Generalizations and refinements effected during the nineteenth century (3)

These seven installments of the article are available through the Early Content program of Jstor.

- 1923: "The History of Notations of the Calculus." Annals of Mathematics, 2nd Ser., Vol. 25, No. 1, pp. 1–46
