= Batch plant =

Batch plant may refer to:

- Asphalt batch mix plant
- Concrete plant
