= Paddle =

Tool for paddling boats or mixing ingredients

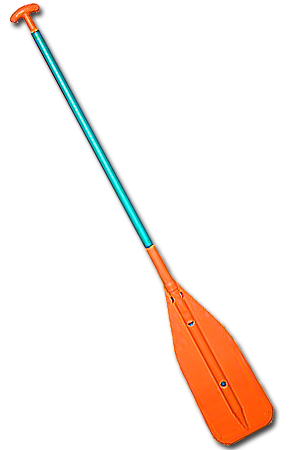
A rafting paddle

A paddle is a handheld tool with an elongated handle and a flat, widened end (the blade) used as a lever to apply force onto the bladed end. It most commonly describes a completely handheld tool used to propel a human-powered watercraft by pushing water in a direction opposite to the direction of travel (i.e. paddling). A paddle is different from an oar (which can be similar in shape and perform the same function via rowing) – an oar is attached to the watercraft via a fulcrum.

The term "paddle" can also be used to describe objects of similar shapes or functions:

- A rotating set of paddle boards known as a paddle wheel is used to propel a steamboat or paddle steamer.
- In a number of racquet sports (e.g. ping-pong and paddle ball), a "paddle" or "bat" is a short, solid racket used to strike a ball.
- A mixing paddle is a device used to stir or mix separate ingredients within a mixture.
- A spanking paddle is used in corporal punishment, typically to forcefully hit someone (e.g. a juvenile) on the buttocks.

== Canoe and kayak paddles ==
=== Materials and designs ===
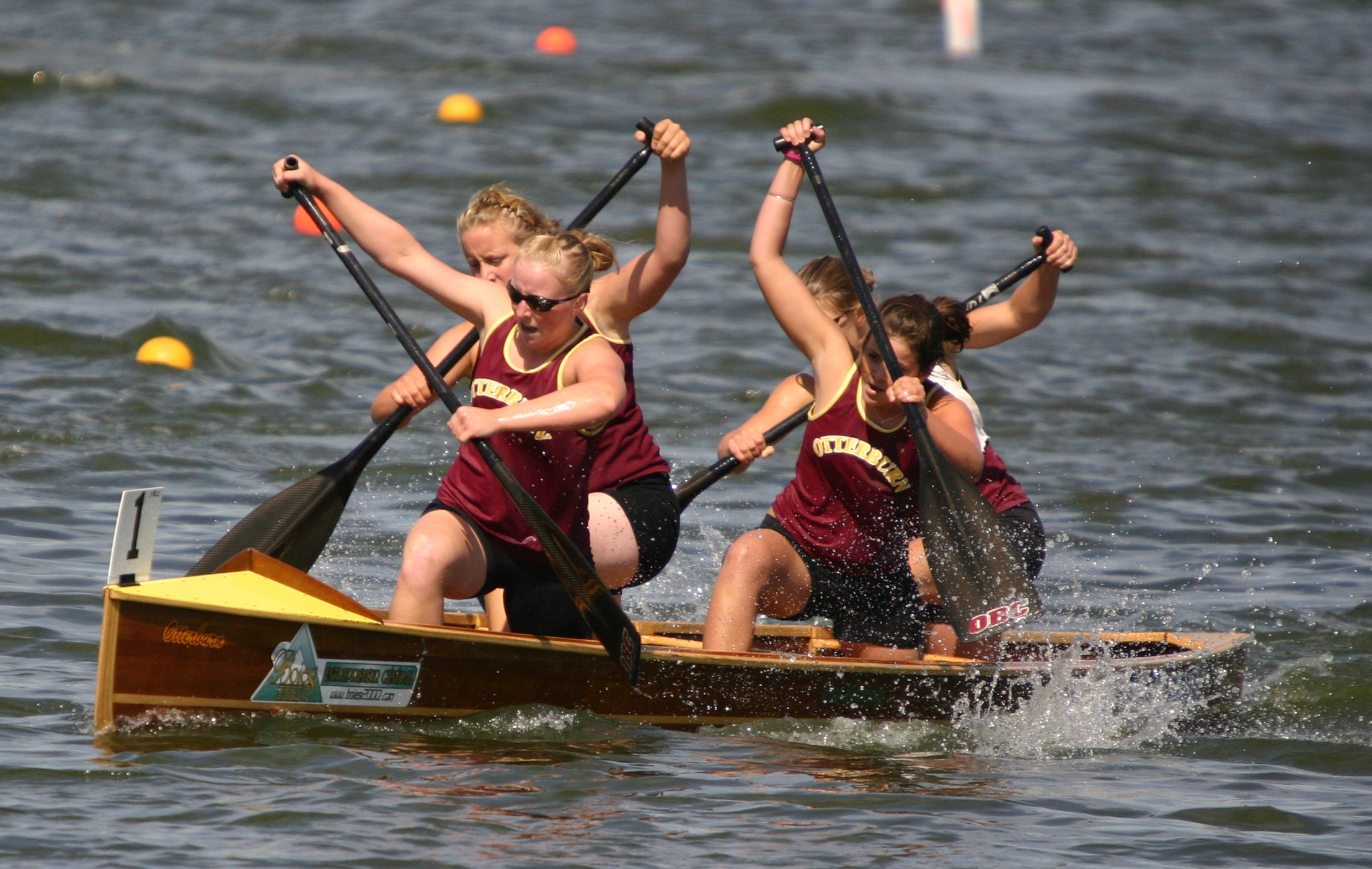
Team of the Boating Club de Canotage Otterburn using canoe paddles

Paddles commonly used in canoes consist of a wooden, fibreglass, carbon fibre, or metal rod (the shaft) with a handle on one end and a rigid sheet (the blade) on the other end. Paddles for use in kayaks are longer, with a blade on each end; they are handled from the middle of the shaft.

Kayak paddles having blades in the same plane (when viewed down the shaft) are called "un-feathered." Paddles with blades in different planes are called "feathered". Feathered paddles are measured by the degree of feather, such as 30, 45, or even 90 degrees. Many modern paddles are made of two pieces which can be snapped together in either feathered or unfeathered settings. The shaft is normally straight but in some cases a 'crank' is added with the aim of making the paddle more comfortable and reducing strain on the wrist. Because the kayak paddle is not supported by the boat, paddles made of lighter materials are desired; it is not uncommon for a kayak paddle to be two pounds (32 ounces (910 grams) ) or less and very expensive paddles can be as light as 22 ounces (620 grams). Weight savings are more desirable at the ends of the paddle rather than in the middle.

Cheaper kayak paddles have an aluminium shaft while more expensive ones use a lighter fibreglass or carbon fibre shaft. Some paddles have a smaller diameter shaft for people with smaller hands. Paddle length varies with a longer paddle being better suited for stronger people, taller people, and people using the paddle in a wider kayak. Some paddle makers have an online paddle size calculator. Blades vary in size and shape. A blade with a larger surface area may be desirable for a strong person with good shoulder joints, but tiring for a weaker person or a person with less than perfect shoulder joints.

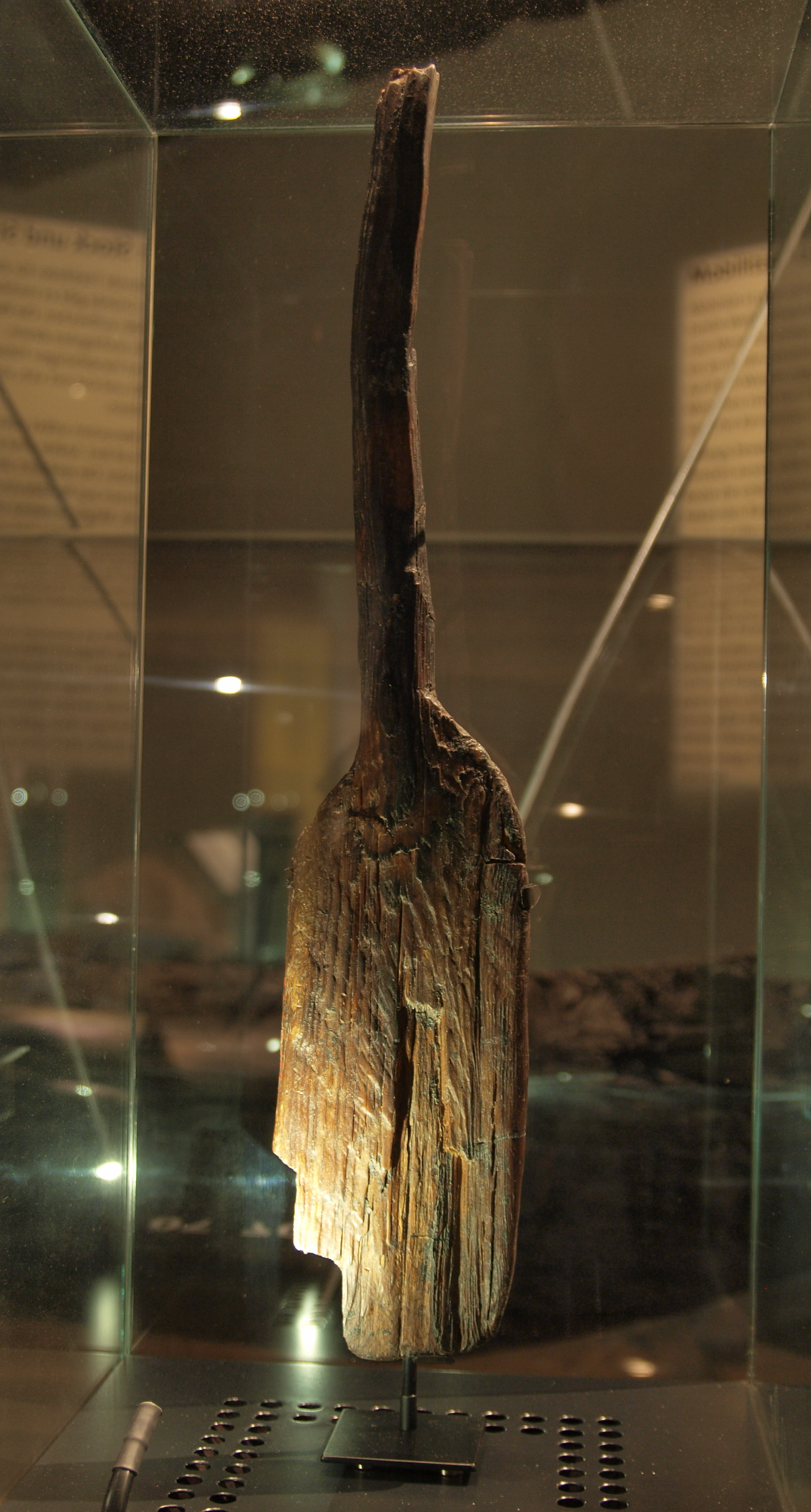
The Duvensee wooden paddle from around 6.200 B.C.

Because normal paddling involves alternately dipping and raising the paddle blades, the colour of the blades may affect the visibility of the kayaker to powerboats operators under limited visibility conditions. For this reason white or yellow blades may offer a safety advantage over black or blue blades. Of course, kayakers should wear a headlamp or have other lighting on their kayak under conditions of limited lighting. However, if a powerboat operator must look straight into a sun low in the sky to see a kayaker, the motion of brightly coloured paddle blades may be of more value than lighting on the kayak. Highly reflective water resistant tape (e.g. SOLAS tape) may be affixed to the paddle blades and boat to enhance visibility.

=== Use ===
The paddle is held with two hands, some distance apart from each other. For normal use, it is drawn through the water from front (bow) to back (stern) to drive the boat forwards. The two blades of a kayak paddle are dipped alternately on either side of the kayak. A paddle is distinguished from an oar in that the paddle is held in the user's hands and completely supported by the paddler, whereas an oar is primarily supported by the boat, through the use of oarlocks. Gloves may be worn to prevent blistering for long periods of paddling.

== History ==
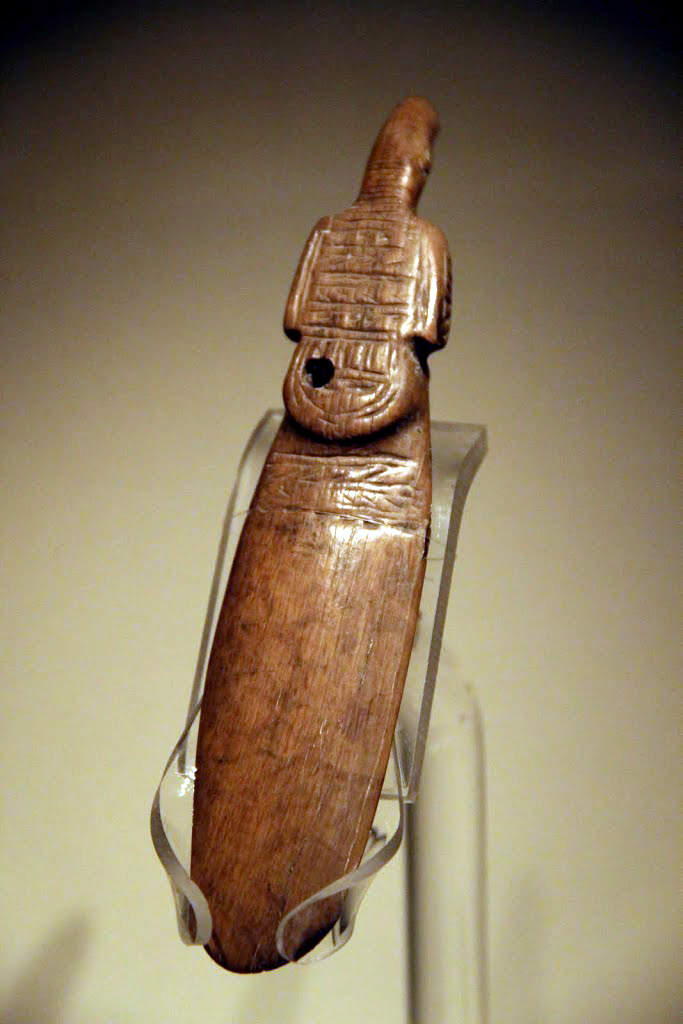
Hemudu Culture artifact of a paddle

The oldest paddle was made by the Hemudu culture near a cave in Yuyao, Zhejiang Province in China in 5000 BC, which predated the Liangzhu paddle also in Zhejiang, which was thought to be the oldest, by 2000 years.

== Other types ==
On mechanical paddle steamers, the motorized paddling is not done with a mass of paddles or oars but by rotating one or a few paddle wheels (rather the inverse of a water mill).

Racing paddles also have special designs. They are generally less flat and are curved to catch more water, which enable racing paddlers to maximize the efficiency of their stroke. Wing bladed paddles are very popular in kayak racing. A wing paddle looks like a spoon and acts like a wing or sail, generating lift on the convex side, which pulls the paddle forward-outward at the expense of overcoming drag. This gives additional forward thrust as compared with a flat paddle with forward thrust mainly from drag. Bent shaft paddles, popular with tripping and marathon canoers, have a blade that is angled from the shaft, usually 12 to 15 degrees.

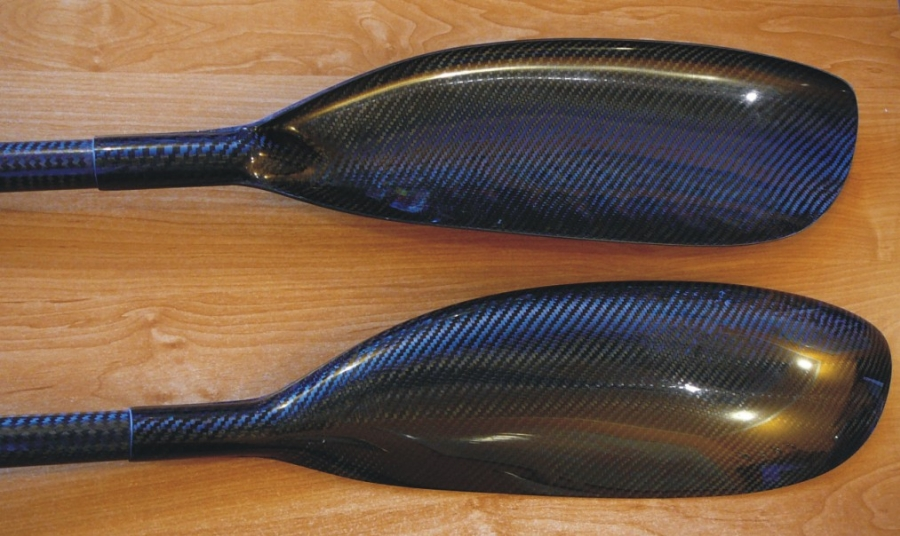
A set of wing paddles

== See also ==
- Canoe paddle strokes
- Mixing paddle
- Oar
- Spanking paddle
