= Stabilized soil mixing plant =

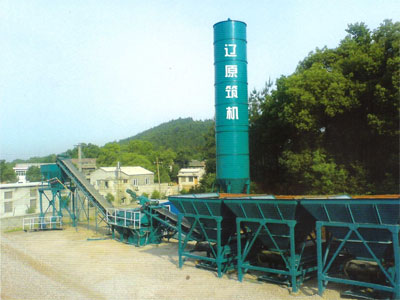
Stabilized soil mixing plant

A stabilized soil mixing plant is a combination of kinds of machines used for mixing stabilized soil, which is used for highway construction, municipal road projects, and fertile airport areas. The plant produces stabilized soil with different gradings in a continuous way. Such a plant usually contains a cement silo, measuring and conveying system, and mixing devices.

== Stabilized soil ==
Stabilized soil is a mixture of lime, cement, coal ash, soil, sand, and other aggregates.

== Classification ==
Stabilized soil mixing plants are of two kinds: the portable stabilized soil mixing plant and the stationary stabilized soil mixing plant. The portable stabilized soil mixing plant has wheels on each part and can be driven by a trailer, but has low productivity. The stationary plant has larger productivity but is less flexible, and needs a firm groundwork.

== Operating principle ==
All aggregates like lime, sand, soil, coal ash, and other materials are loaded into batching hoppers by a loading machine. After measuring, the belt feeder transports the aggregates into a mixing device. Meanwhile, stabilizing powders like lime or cement are transferred from a powder material warehouse to the batch hopper by a spiral conveyor, and then moved to the belt feeder by a powder material feeder. All ingredients then go into the mixing device for final processing. Finally, the feeding belt conveyor takes the final product and delivers it to the storage warehouse.
