= Stephen Stepanian =

Stephen Stepanian

Stephen Stepanian (February 28, 1882 – October 1964) (Armenian: Ստեփան Ստեփանեան) was an Armenian American inventor and owner of numerous patents including the Elevator and Conveyor, Compound Tool, and the Wrench. He is also accredited as the inventor of a self-discharging motorized transit mixer that was the predecessor of the concrete mixer truck. Stepanian is often called the "father of the ready-mix concrete industry."

== Life ==
Of Armenian descent, Stepanian moved to Grandview Heights, Ohio, in 1906. He is credited with rescuing 13 people from a tree using a makeshift raft during the 1913 flood in Columbus, Ohio. They had been in the tree some 48 hours when Stepanian used a raft he made from floating timbers and a pole to navigate them, 2-3 at a time, to safety. He resided on Glenn Avenue near Bluff. Stepanian became president of Marble Cliff Quarries and the Central Ohio Concrete Company. Eventually, Stepanian founded the Arrow Concrete Company, a company that is still in service today. He was elected as an honorary member of the board of directors for the National Ready Mixed Concrete Association.

Stepanian was honored by the 1954 National Ready Mixed Concrete Association annual convention which named him an honorary lifetime member. In 2004, Stepanian was selected as one of the Top 100 Transportation Private Sector Professionals by the American Road and Transportation Builders Association.

== Inventor of concrete mixing truck ==
Stephen invented a self-discharging motorized transit mixer that was the predecessor of the concrete mixer truck and applied for a patent in 1916. However, the patent was rejected in April 1917 by the patent office because it was believed that a truck could not support the weight of a concrete mixer on top of it. The patent office also noted that there was no previous patenting information that proves integration was possible with both the mixer and the design of the truck. Other sources suggest that the patent was rejected because Stepanian was not an American citizen. However, on December 21, 1928, Stepanian reapplied for the patent and received approval on November 21, 1933.

== Notable patents ==
- Wrench United States Patent No. 1,321,776, filing date: May 29, 1918, issue date: Nov. 11, 1919.
- Concrete Mixing and Transporting Vehicle United States Patent No. 1,935,922, filing date: Dec. 21, 1928, issue date: Nov. 21, 1933.
- Sample Display Holder United States Patent No. 1,730,439, filing date Apr. 24, 1926, issue date: Oct. 8, 1929.
- Compound Tool United States Patent No. 1,321,777, filing date: Feb. 24, 1919, issue date: Nov. 11, 1919.
- Elevator and Conveyor United States Patent No. 859,588, filing date: Sep. 9, 1904, issue date: Jul. 9, 1907.
- Building Apparatus United States Patent No. 2,440,920, filing date: Aug. 15, 1941, issue date: May 4, 1948.
- Garment United States Patent No. 1,997,703, filing date: April 7, 1933, issue date: April 16, 1935.
