= Volumetric concrete mixer =

Type of concrete mixer

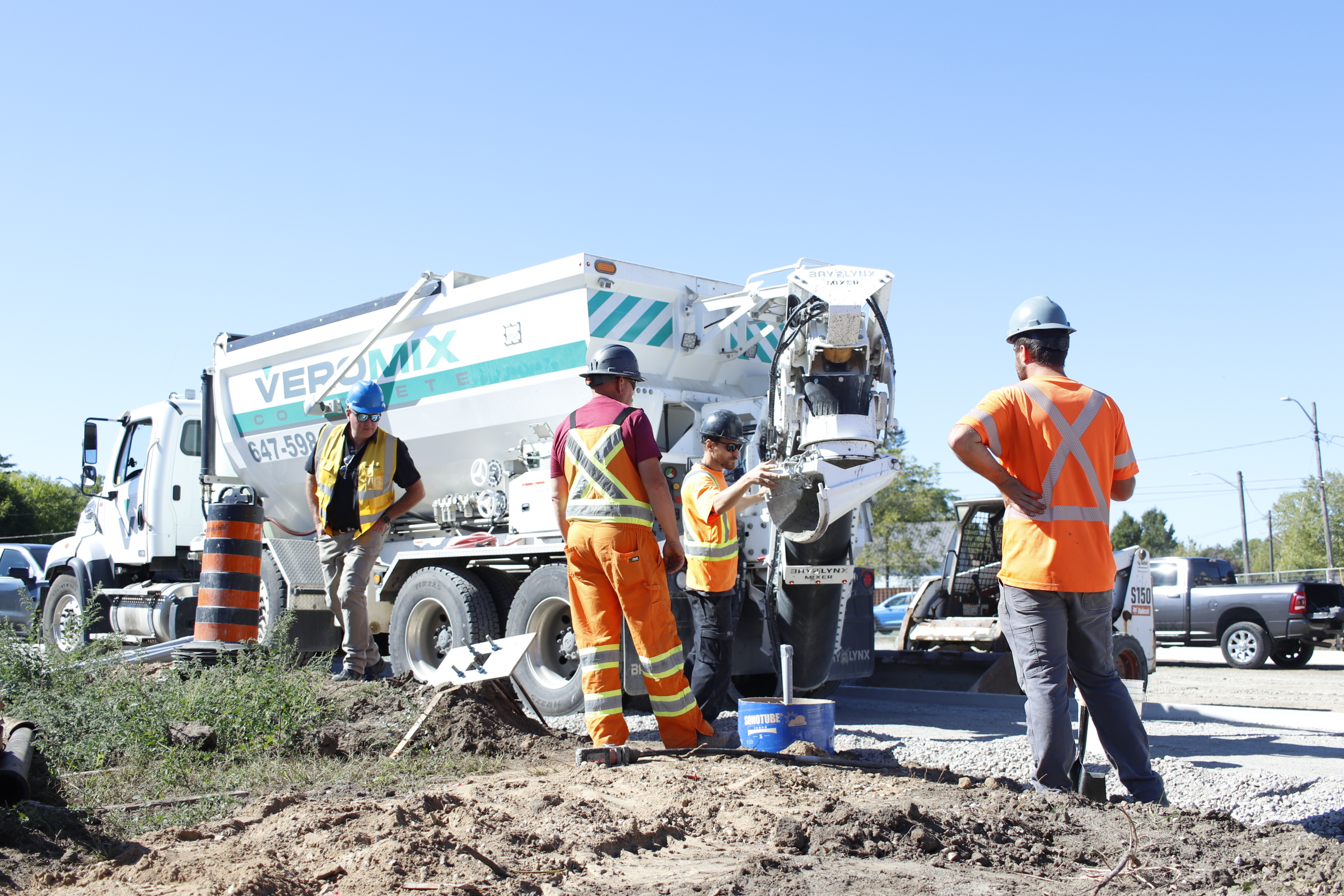
A Modern Volumetric Concrete Mixer

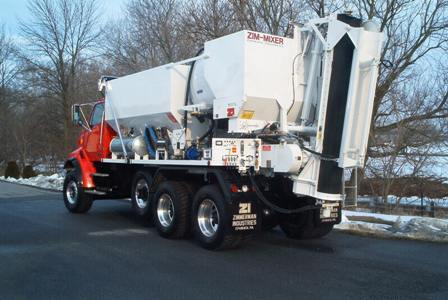
A volumetric concrete mixer

A volumetric concrete mixer (also known as volumetric mobile mixer) is a concrete mixer mounted on a truck or trailer that contains separate compartments for sand, stone, cement and water.

On arrival at the job site, the machine mixes the materials to produce the exact amount of concrete needed.

== How It Works ==
Volumetric mixers batch, measure, mix and dispense all from one unit. Volumetric concrete mixers can produce exactly the amount of concrete needed when it is needed at any time. Some concrete suppliers offer general purpose concrete batched in a volumetric mixer as a practical alternative to ready-mix if quantities and schedules are not fully known, to eliminate waste and prevent premature stiffening of the mix.

The volumetric mixer varies in capacity size up to 12 m^{3} and has a production rate of around 60m^{3} an hour depending on the mix design. Many volumetric concrete mixer manufacturers have innovated the mixer in capacity and design, as well as added features including color, multiple admixes, fiber systems, and the ability to do gunite or shotcrete.

The advantages of a volumetric mixer include:

- Reduces waste and associated costs by providing exact quantities.
- No risk of premature stiffening of concrete if delays are encountered.
- Permits delivery of smaller quantities of concrete.
- Night time works do not require the re-opening of a concrete batch plant.
- Flexibility to alternate between multiple concrete mixes as required for the application.
- Ability to do continuous concrete pours

== Sustainability ==
- Less waste - exact amount of concrete is poured
- Less water - volumetric concrete mixers use on average 8-10 gallons of water to clean out versus 200 gallons for a traditional barrel truck
- Less emissions - the truck does not need to idle while waiting to pour concrete

== History ==
In the mid-1960s, companies such as Cemen Tech, Reimer Mixers (manufactured under the name ProAll circa 2016), and Zimmerman began building their own versions of volumetric concrete mixers.

In 1999, equipment manufacturers created a trade association, Volumetric Mixer Manufacturers Bureau (VMMB). It had six charter members: Cemen Tech, Inc., Zimmerman Ind, Inc., ProAll Reimer, Bay-Lynx, Custom-Crete, and Elkin. Currently its members include (in alphabetical order): Bay-Lynx, Cemen Tech, Holcombe Mixers, ProAll Reimer Mixers, and Zimmerman Ind, Inc.
