= Phoenix boat =

A phoenix boat is a very long and narrow human-powered boat used in the team paddling sport of phoenix boat racing. Unlike a dragon boat, it is relatively small in size, and is always rigged with decorative Chinese phoenix heads and tails. The boat is ridden by women as often as by men.

== See also ==
- Dragon boat
