= Agitator (device) =

Device or mechanism which shakes or stirs something

An agitator is a device or mechanism to put something into motion by shaking or stirring. There are several types of agitation machines, including washing machine agitators (which rotate back and forth) and magnetic agitators (which contain a magnetic bar rotating in a magnetic field). Agitators can come in many sizes and varieties, depending on the application.

In general, agitators usually consist of an impeller and a shaft. An impeller is a rotor located within a tube or conduit attached to the shaft. It helps enhance the pressure in order for the flow of a fluid be done. Modern industrial agitators incorporate process control to maintain better control over the mixing process.

== Washing machine agitator ==
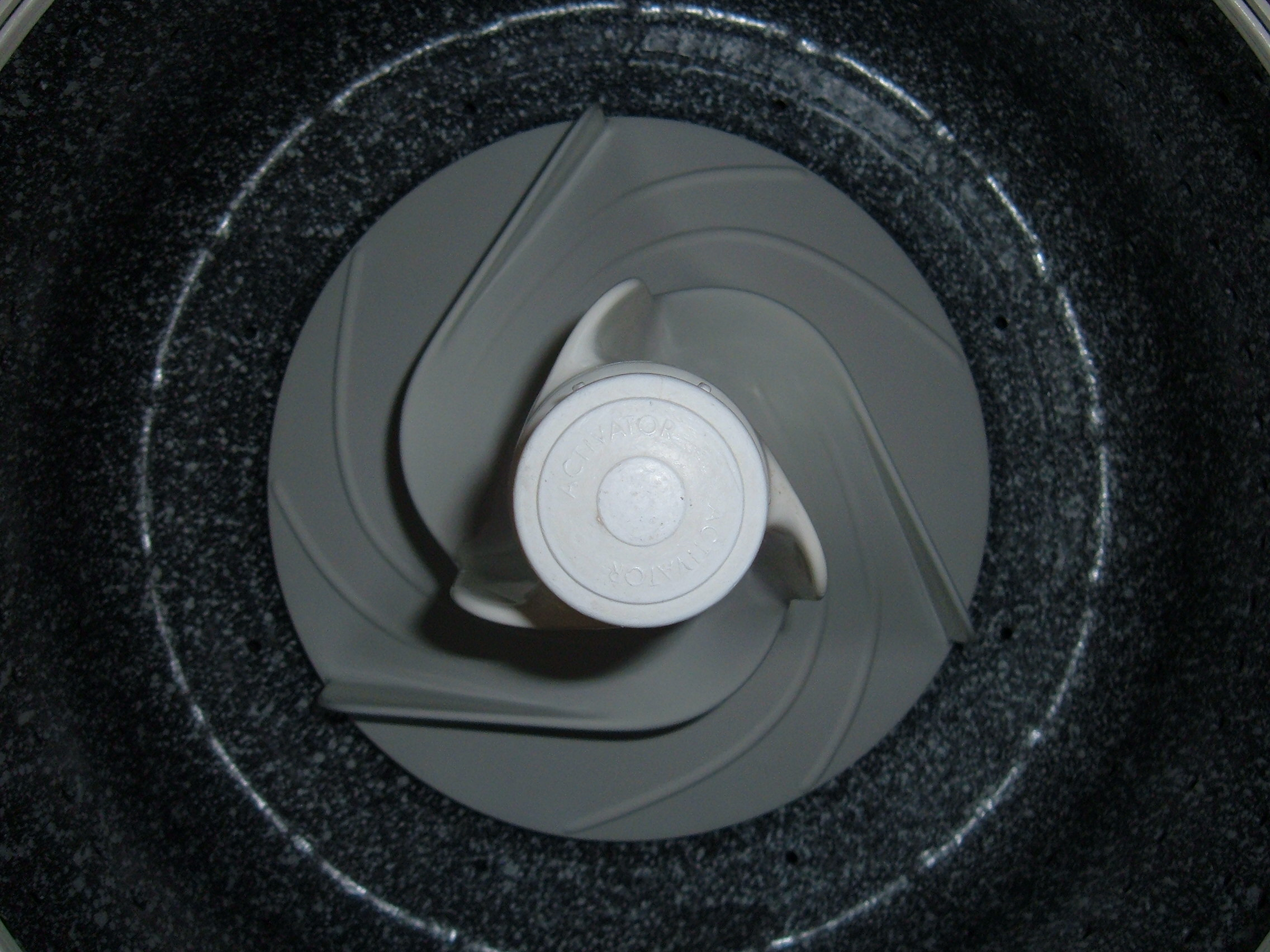
Agitator for a laundromat washing machine.

In a top load washing machine the agitator projects from the bottom of the wash basket and creates the wash action by rotating back and forth, rolling garments from the top of the load, down to the bottom, then back up again.

There are several types of agitators with the most common being the "straight-vane" and "dual-action" agitators. The "straight-vane" is a one-part agitator with bottom and side fins that usually turns back and forth. The Dual-action is a two-part agitator that has bottom washer fins that move back and forth and a spiral top that rotates clockwise to help guide the clothes to the bottom washer fins.

The modern agitator, which is dual-action, was first made in Kenmore Appliances washing machines in the 1980s to present. These agitators are known by the company as dual-rollover and triple-rollover action agitators.

== Magnetic agitator ==
This is a device formed by a metallic bar (called the agitation bar) which is normally covered by a plastic layer, and a sheet that has underneath it a rotatory magnet or a series of electromagnets arranged in a circular form to create a magnetic rotatory field. Commonly, the sheet has an arrangement of electric resistances that can heat some chemical solutions.

During the operation of a typical magnetic agitator, the agitator bar is moved inside a container such as to dissolve a substance in a liquid. The container must be placed on the sheet, so that the magnetic field influences the agitation bar and makes it rotate. This allows it to mix different substances at high speeds.

== Agitation rack ==
An agitation rack is a special form of agitator used to store platelets. It is composed of a series of clasps attached to motorised bars, that rock the specimens of platelets gently back-and-forth. This prevents them from becoming activated and adhering to one another, which cannot be reversed by any current means.

== See also ==
- Impeller
- Tedder
- Mixing (disambiguation)
- Mixing paddle
