= Reversing drum mixer =

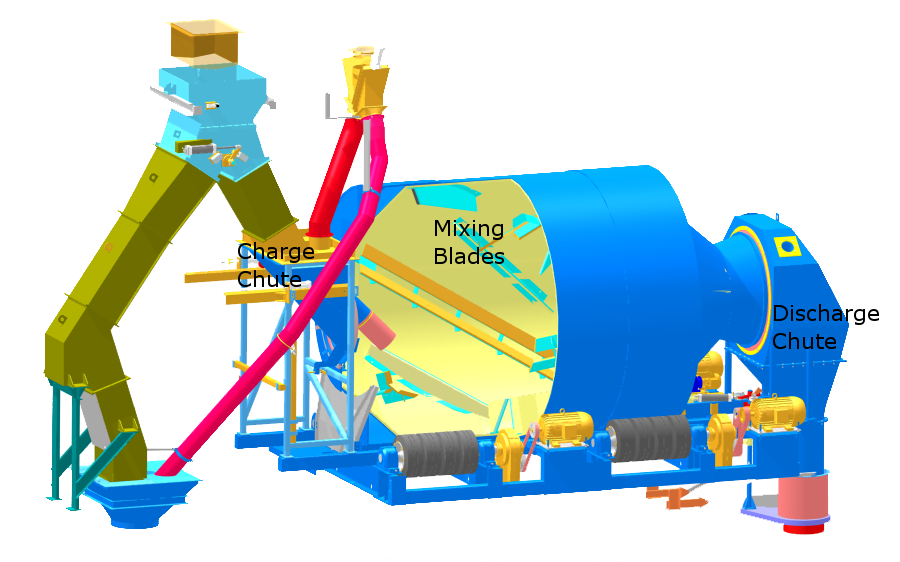
A partial cross section of a reversing drum mixer

A reversing drum mixer (also commonly called a non-tilting mixer) is a type of concrete mixer that produces concrete in single batches. The entire drum rotates around its axis as materials are loaded through a charge chute at one end of the drum and exit through a discharge chute at the opposite end of the drum.

== Mixing Action ==
Mixing blades are mounted on the inside surface of the drum, and as the drum rotates, the blades mix by lifting and dropping the materials during each rotation. Once the materials are sufficiently mixed the rotation of the drum is reversed and the blade arrangement pushes the concrete through to the discharge end of the mixer.

Industrial sized reversing drum mixers can have a capacity of 9 m³ and can produce a mid quality concrete mix in as little as 40 seconds. Reversing drum mixers provide for efficient mixing and leave very little build up within the mixer. Wear is reduced as the drum rests on rubber or polyurethane wheels and there is no steel on steel contact. There is no direct contact between the stationary charge and discharge chutes and the rotating drum. The flexible tires, absorb vibration and make for low maintenance and a quiet operation. The efficient mixing within the concrete, results in a reduction in wear of the drum liners. The reversing drum mixers are known for the extremely low maintenance and operating costs, yet a good mixing effect relative to other drum mixers.
