= Ready-mix concrete =

Concrete that is manufactured in a batch plant, according to a set engineered mix design

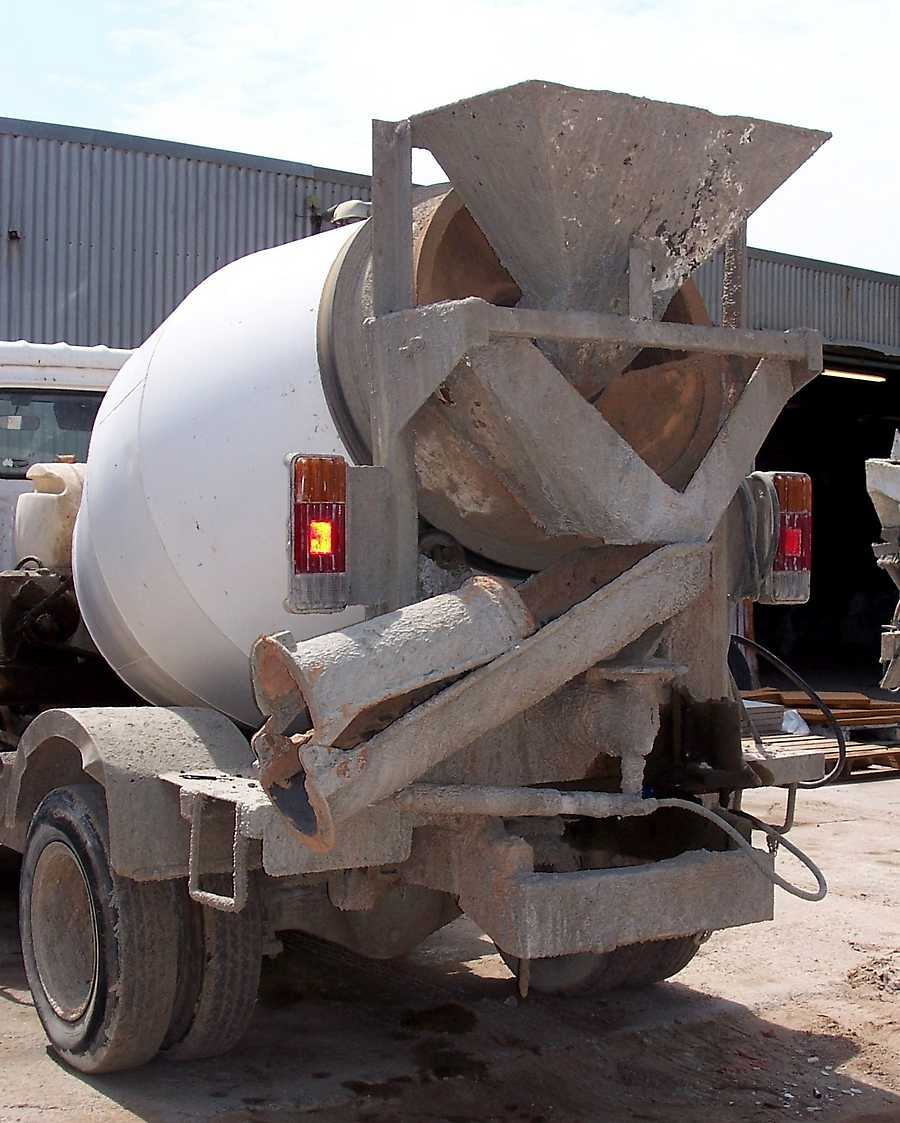
1.6 m³ transit mixer

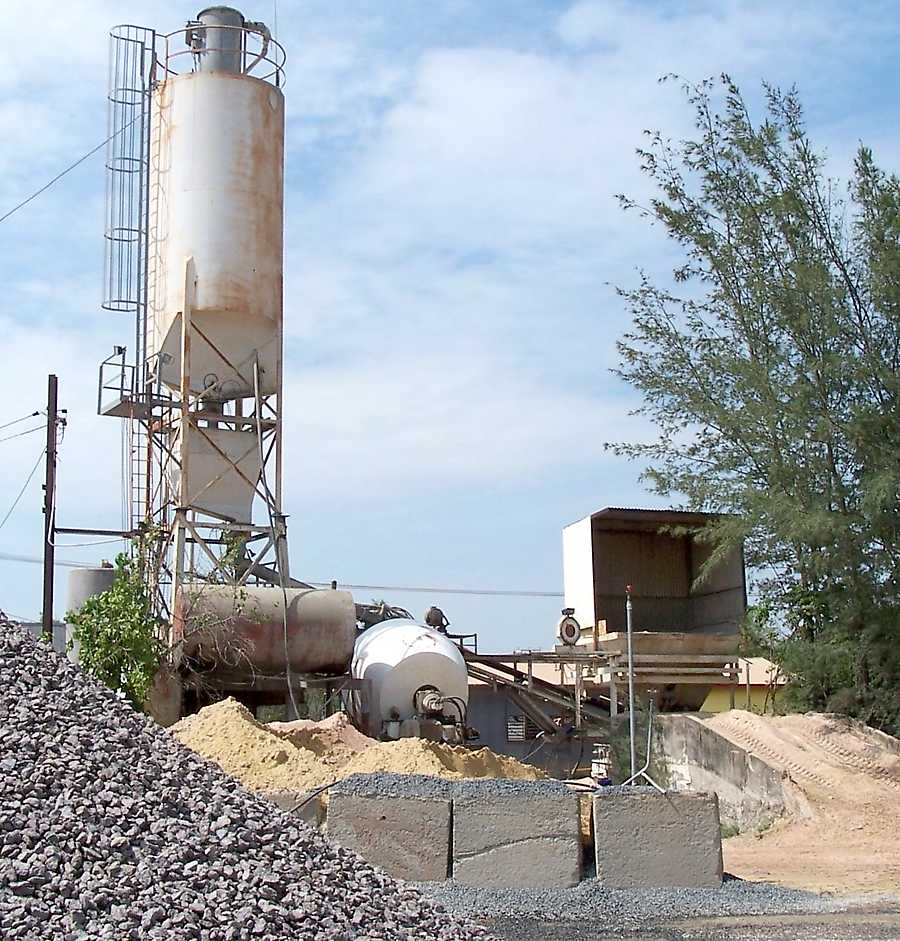
Small batching plant for local small deliveries

The inside of a volumetric mixer. It uses a simple Archimedes' screw to mix (clockwise) and to lift the concrete to the delivery chute.

Ready-mix concrete (RMC) is concrete that is manufactured in a batch plant, according to each specific job requirement, then delivered to the job site "ready to use".

There are two types with the first being the barrel truck or in-transit mixers. This type of truck delivers concrete in a plastic state to the site. The second is the volumetric concrete mixer. This delivers the ready mix in a dry state and then mixes the concrete on site. However, other sources divide the material into three types: Transit Mix, Central Mix or Shrink Mix concrete.

Ready-mix concrete refers to concrete that is specifically manufactured for customers' construction projects, and supplied to the customer on site as a single product. It is a mixture of Portland or other cements, water and aggregates: sand, gravel, or crushed stone. All aggregates should be of a washed type material with limited amounts of fines or dirt and clay. An admixture is often added to improve workability of the concrete and/or increase setting time of concrete (using retarders) to factor in the time required for the transit mixer to reach the site. The global market size is disputed depending on the source. It was estimated at 650 billion dollars in 2019. However it was estimated at just under 500 billion dollars in 2018.

== History ==
There is some dispute as to when the first ready-mix delivery was made and when the first factory was built. Some sources suggest as early as 1913 in Baltimore. By 1929 there were over 100 plants operating in the United States. The industry did not expand significantly until the 1960s, and has continued to grow since then.

== Design ==
Batch plants combine a precise amount of gravel, sand, water and cement by weight (as per a mix design formulation for the grade of concrete recommended by the structural engineer or architect), allowing specialty concrete mixtures to be developed and implemented on construction sites.

Ready-mix concrete is often used instead of other materials due to the cost and wide range of uses in building, particularly in large projects like high-rise buildings and bridges. It has a long life span when compared to other products of a similar use, like roadways. It has an average life span of 30 years under high traffic areas compared to the 10 to 12 year life of asphalt concrete with the same traffic.

Ready-mixed concrete is used in construction projects where the construction site is not willing, or is unable, to mix concrete on site. Using ready-mixed concrete means product is delivered finished, on demand, in the specific quantity required, in the specific mix design required. For a small to medium project, the cost and time of hiring mixing equipment, labour, plus purchase and storage for the ingredients of concrete, added to environmental concerns (cement dust is an airborne health hazard) may simply be not worthwhile when compared to the cost of ready-mixed concrete, where the customer pays for what they use, and allows others do the work up to that point. For a large project, outsourcing concrete production to ready-mixed concrete suppliers means delegating the quality control and testing, material logistics and supply chain issues and mix design, to specialists who are already established for those tasks, trading off against introducing another contracted external supplier who needs to make a profit, and losing the control and immediacy of on-site mixing.

Ready-mix concrete is bought and sold by volume – usually expressed in cubic meters (cubic yards in the US). Batching and mixing is done under controlled conditions. In the UK, ready-mixed concrete is specified either informally, by constituent weight or volume (1-2-4 or 1-3-6 being common mixes) or using the formal specification standards of the European standard EN 206+ A1, which is supplemented in the UK by BS 8500. This allows the customer to specify what the concrete has to be able to withstand in terms of ground conditions, exposure, and strength, and allows the concrete manufacturer to design a mix that meets that requirement using the materials locally available to a batching plant. This is verified by laboratory testing, such as performing cube tests to verify compressive strength, flexural tests, and supplemented by field testing, such as slump tests done on site to verify plasticity of the mix.

The performance of a concrete mix can be altered by use of admixtures. Admixtures can be used to reduce water requirements, entrain air into a mixture, to improve surface durability, or even superplasticize concrete to make it self-levelling, as self-consolidating concrete, the use of admixtures requires precision in dosing and mix design, which is more difficult without the dosing/measuring equipment and laboratory backing of a batching plant, which means they are not easily used outside of ready-mixed concrete.

Concrete has a limited lifespan between batching / mixing and curing. This means that ready-mixed concrete should be placed within 30 to 45 minutes of the batching process to hold slump and mix design specifications in the US, though in the UK, environmental and material factors, plus in-transit mixing, allow for up two hours to elapse. Modern admixtures and water reducers can modify that time span to some degree.

Ready-mixed concrete can be transported and placed at site using a number of methods. The most common and simplest is the chute fitted to the back of transit mixer trucks (as in picture), which is suitable for placing concrete near locations where a truck can back in. Dumper trucks, crane hoppers, truck-mounted conveyors, and, in extremis, wheelbarrows, can be used to place concrete from trucks where access is not direct. Some concrete mixes are suitable for pumping with a concrete pump.

In 2011, there were 2,223 companies employing 72,925 workers that produced ready-mix concrete in the United States.

== Advantages of ready-mix concrete ==
- Materials are combined in a batch plant, and the hydration process begins at the moment water meets the cement, so the travel time from the plant to the site, and the time before the concrete is placed on-site, is critical over longer distances. Some sites are just too distant. The use of admixtures, retarders, and cement-like pulverized fly ash or ground granulated blast-furnace slag (GGBFS) can be used to slow the hydration process, allowing for longer transit and waiting time.
- Concrete is formable and pourable, but a steady supply is needed for large forms. If there is a supply interruption, and the concrete cannot be poured all at once, a cold joint may appear in the finished form.
- The biggest advantage is that concrete is produced under controlled conditions. Therefore, Quality concrete is obtained, as a ready-mix concrete mix plant makes use of sophisticated equipment and consistent methods. There is strict control over the testing of materials, process parameters, and continuous monitoring of key practices during the manufacturing process. Poor control on the input materials, batching and mixing methods in the case of site mix concrete is solved in a ready-mix concrete production method.
- Speed in the construction practices followed in ready mix concrete plant is followed continuously by having mechanized operations. The output obtained from a site mix concrete plant using a 8/12 mixer is 4 to 5 metric cubes per hour which is 30-60 metric cubes per hour in a ready mix concrete plant.
- Better handling and proper mixing practice will help reduce the consumption of cement by 10 – 12%. The use of admixtures and other cementitious materials will help to reduce the amount of cement as is required to make the desired grade of concrete.
- Less consumption of cement indirectly results in less environmental pollution.
- Ready mix concrete manufacture have less dependency on human labor hence the chances of human error are reduced. This will also reduce the dependency on intensive labor.
- Cracking and shrinkage. Concrete shrinks as it cures. It can shrink 1/16 inch (1.6 mm) over a 10-foot long area (3.05 meters). This causes stress internally on the concrete and must be accounted for by the engineers and finishers placing the concrete, and may require the use of steel reinforcement or pre-stressed concrete elements where this is critical.
- Access roads and site access have to be able to carry the weight of the ready-mix truck plus load which can be up to 32 tonnes for an eight-wheel 9 m^{3} truck. (Green concrete is approximately 2,328 kilograms per cubic metre (3,924 lb/cu yd). This problem can be overcome by utilizing so-called "mini mix" trucks which use smaller 4 m^{3} capacity mixers able to reach more weight restricted sites. Even smaller mixers are used to allow a 7.5 tonne truck to hold approximately 1.25 m^{3}, to reach restricted inner city areas with bans on larger trucks.

== Metered concrete ==
As an alternative to centralized batch plant system is the volumetric mobile mixer. This is often referred to as on-site concrete, site mixed concrete or mobile mix concrete. This is a mobile miniaturized version of the large stationary batch plant. They are used to provide ready mix concrete utilizing a continuous batching process or metered concrete system. The volumetric mobile mixer is a truck that holds sand, rock, cement, water, fiber, and some add mixtures and color depending on how the batch plant is outfitted. These trucks mix or batch the ready mix on the job site. This type of truck can mix as much or as little amount of concrete as needed. The on-site mixing eliminates the travel time hydration that can cause the transit mixed concrete to become unusable. These trucks are as precise as the centralized batch plant system, since the trucks are scaled and tested using the same ASTM (American standard test method) like all other ready mix manufactures. This is a hybrid approach between centralized batch plants and traditional on-site mixing. Each type of system has advantages and disadvantages, depending on the location, size of the job, and mix design set forth by the engineer.

=== Transit mixed ready mix versus volumetric mixed ready mix ===
- A centralized concrete batching plant can serve a wide area. Site-mix trucks can serve an even larger area including very remote locations that standard trucks cannot.
- The batch plants are located in areas zoned for industrial use, while the delivery trucks can service residential districts or inner cities. Site-mix trucks have the same capabilities.
- Volumetric trucks often have a lower water demand during the batching process. This will produce a concrete that can be significantly stronger in compressive strength compared to the centralized batch plant for the same mix design using the ASTM C109 test method.
- Centralized batch systems are limited by the size of the fleet. It may take upwards of 10 minutes to batch and load out one 9–12 cubic yards (6.9–9.2 cubic metres) truck depending on the plant size and type. They are unable to change mix designs in the middle of an individual batching process, but can quickly offer a greater range of mixes overall as a central yard has more stock capacity for different types of cement, aggregates, and admixtures than a single truck has room for on site.
- Volumetric mixers can seamlessly change all aspects of the mix design while still producing concrete, as long as the raw materials are on site. They can continuously mix quality concrete for an indefinite time while being continuously loaded with fresh materials. They can produce 1 yard of concrete in as little as 40 seconds depending on the mix design and batch plant size outfitted.
- Centralised batching, using the same supply of materials over a long period (a fixed plant will likely have a fixed set of suppliers in its locality), the same scales which can be calibrated by weighbridges, the same measuring equipment for admixtures, moisture etc., and often the same batching operator, can have tighter tolerances for mixes, use a centralised lab to design and verify dozens of mixes to different specifications across multiple jobs for that plant, and can therefore produce a very predictable, consistent result for major projects. Each plant will have a batching recipe book (or equivalent automated batching program) to batch and load any quantity of any mix design on demand.
- Centralized batching can scale quickly with less movement than on site mixers, using aggregate trucks, cement tankers and ground stocks to achieve up to 240 cubic metres an hour from a single plant. This allows consistent large-scale pours across a site quickly, as supply logistics for cement, water, and aggregate are fixed to a single point with greater storage capacity, and therefore easier to scale, and more tolerant of short supply interruptions.
- For small loads (orders under 10 yards) transit mixers typically return to their batch plant after each delivery. Volumetric trucks can go directly from job to job until a truck is emptied, reducing traffic and fuel consumption.

== See also ==
- Types of concrete
- Reinforced concrete
- RMC Group plc, formerly Ready Mixed Concrete Limited
