= Concrete mixer =

Device that combines cement, aggregate, and water to form concrete

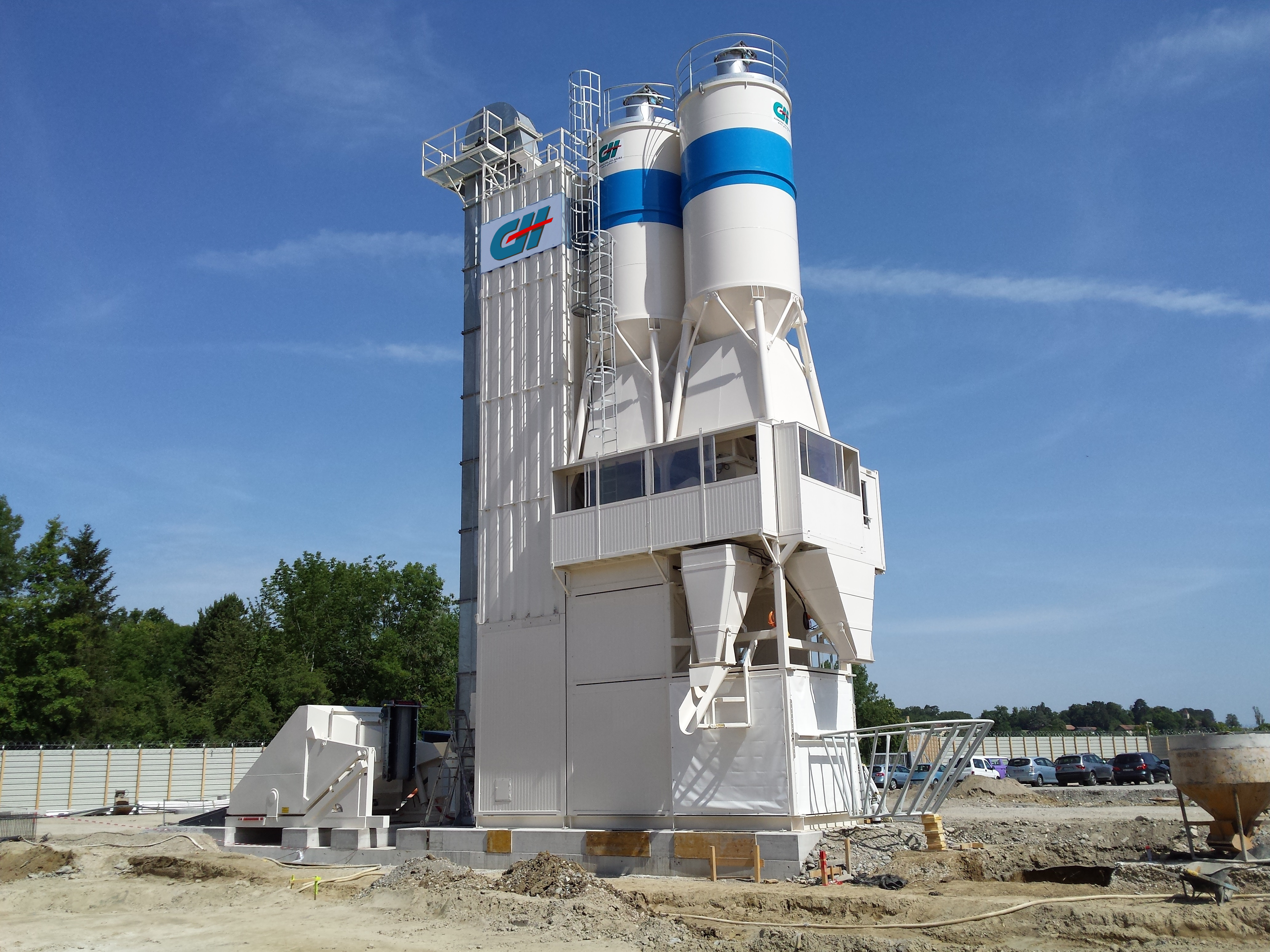
Concrete mixer

A concrete mixer (also cement mixer) is a device that homogeneously combines cement, aggregate (e.g. sand or gravel), and water to form concrete. A typical concrete mixer uses a revolving drum to mix the components. For smaller volume works, portable concrete mixers are often used so that the concrete can be made at the construction site, giving the workers ample time to use the concrete before it hardens. An alternative to a machine is mixing concrete by hand. This is usually done in a wheelbarrow; however, several companies have recently begun to sell modified tarps for this purpose.

The concrete mixer was invented by Columbus, Ohio, industrialist Gebhardt Jaeger. However Stothert & Pitt's 1885 Price Book records Messers H. Lee & Co used a Lee's Mixer during the construction of the Admiralty Pier at Dover, Kent. Their US Price Book distributor was E. & F. N. Spon, Booksellers, 35 Murray St, New York.

== History ==
One of the first concrete mixers ever was developed in 1900 by T.L. Smith in Milwaukee. The mixer already exhibited the still common basic construction with a tiltable conical drum (as a double cone at that time) with blades. On February 9, 1904, the first portable concrete mixer was patented by Richard Bodlaender, an inventor from Breslau, Germany. This concrete mixer was horse-drawn and called 'Mortar Mixer'. It worked by replacing the front wheels with a large drum that held large paddles for mixing the cement. In 1925, at least two mixers, built 25 years ago, were still in use (serial numbers 37 and 82). The Smith Mascot in essence has the same construction as the small mixers used today. In the 1920s, the T.L. Smith Company in Milwaukee built the world's largest concrete mixers. Mixers of this company were used e. g. for the construction of the Wilson Dam (six 2-yard and two 4-yard mixers, at the time the largest single installation of the largest concrete mixers in the world), the first stadium of the Ohio State University and the Exchequer Dam. Roscoe Lee was granted a patent in 1934 for his transit concrete mixer design. This design made it possible for new trucks to be turned into concrete mixers by using a crane to put a drum on the back of the truck. It was less expensive than a cement truck dedicated to only carrying cement and allowed the trucks used to continue to be adapted for other things. Concrete mixers have continued to advance. Recently, research detailing a forward simulation model of an energy-saving concrete mixer using hydraulic technology was released based on Matlab/Simulink technology.

== Industrial mixers ==
Today's market increasingly requires consistent homogeneity and short mixing times for the industrial production of ready-mix concrete, and more so for precast/prestressed concrete. This has resulted in refinement of mixing technologies for concrete production. Different styles of stationary mixers have been developed, each with its own inherent strengths targeting different parts of the concrete production market. The most common mixers used today fall into three categories:

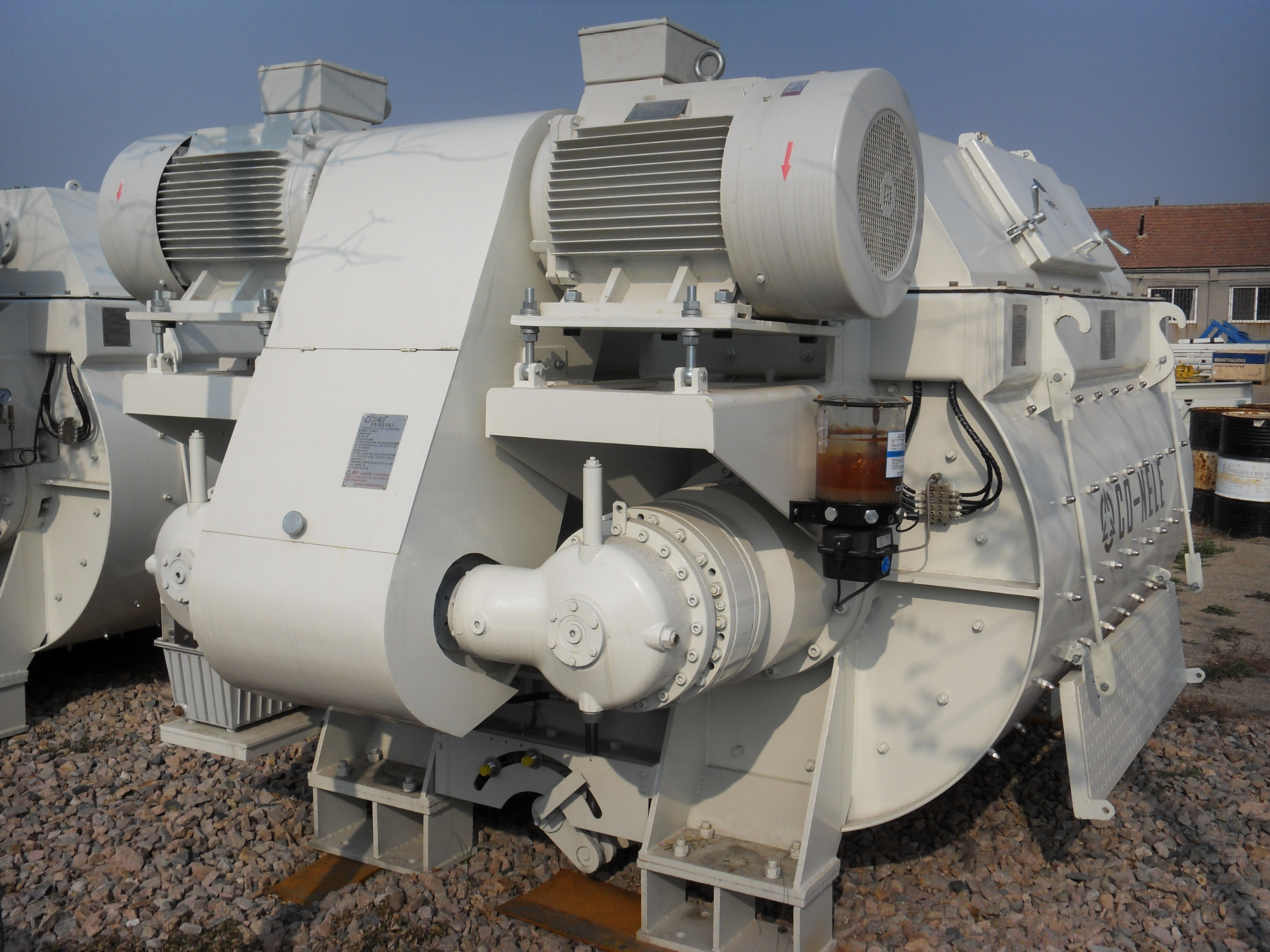
Twin shaft concrete mixer for a concrete plant

- Twin-shaft mixers, known for their high intensity mixing and short mixing times. These mixers are typically used for high strength concrete, RCC and SCC, typically in batches of 2–6 m^{3} (2.6–7.8 cu yd).
- Vertical axis mixers, most commonly used for precast and prestressed concrete. This style of mixer cleans well between batches, and is favoured for coloured concrete, smaller batches (typically 0.75–3 m^{3} or 0.98–3.92 cu yd), and multiple discharge points. Within this category, the pan mixers are losing popularity to the more efficient planetary (or counter-current) mixers, as the additional mixing action helps in production of more critical concrete mixes (colour consistency, SCC, etc.).
- Drum mixers (reversing drum mixer and tilting drum mixers), used where large volumes (batch sizes of 3–9 m^{3} or 3.9–11.8 cu yd) are being produced. This type of mixer is capable of high production outputs.

Each mixer style has its own inherent strengths and weaknesses, and are used around the world to varying degrees of popularity.

== Trucks and trailers ==
=== Concrete mixing transport trucks ===
Operation diagram of a truck mixer

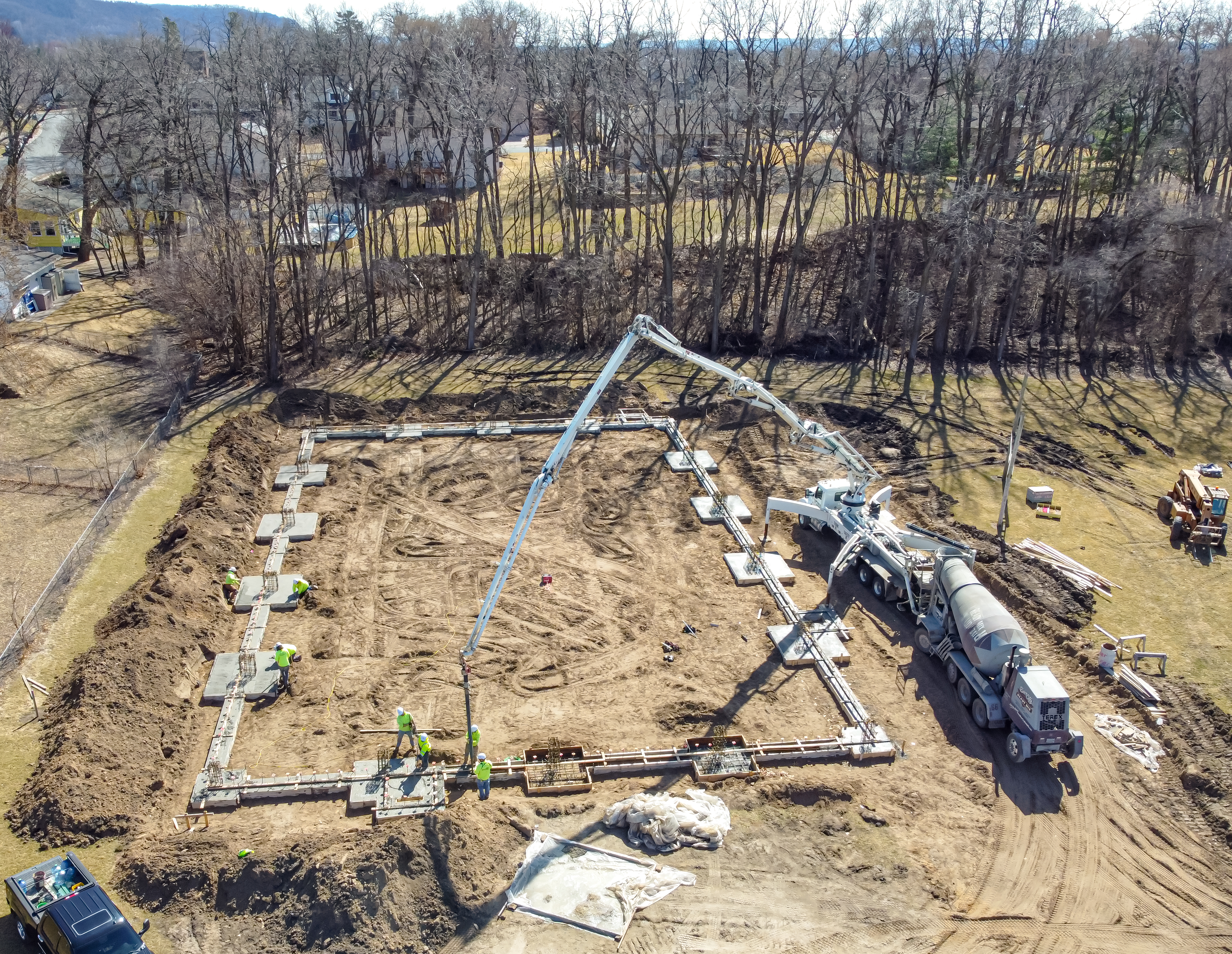
Concrete pump boom truck being fed by a concrete mixer truck

Special concrete transport trucks (in-transit mixers) are made to mix concrete and transport it to the construction site. They can be charged with dry materials and water, with the mixing occurring during transport. They can also be loaded from a "central mix" plant; with this process the material has already been mixed prior to loading. The concrete mixing transport truck maintains the material's liquid state through agitation, or turning of the drum, until delivery. These trucks have an interior turbine that pushes the mixed concrete up against gravity inside the drum. The interior of the drum on a concrete mixing truck is fitted with a spiral blade. In one rotational direction, the concrete is pushed deeper into the drum. This is the direction the drum is rotated while the concrete is being transported to the building site. This is known as "charging" the mixer. When the drum rotates in the other direction, the Archimedes' screw-type arrangement "discharges", or forces the concrete out of the drum. From there it may go onto chutes to guide the viscous concrete directly to the job site. If the truck cannot get close enough to the site to use the chutes, the concrete may be discharged into a concrete pump, connected to a flexible hose, or onto a conveyor belt which can be extended some distance (typically ten or more metres). A pump provides the means to move the material to precise locations, multi-floor buildings, and other distance-prohibitive locations. Buckets suspended from cranes are also used to place the concrete. The drum is traditionally made of steel but on some newer trucks, fibreglass has been used as a weight reduction measure. Most cement trucks weigh a substantial amount empty, meaning they have very heavy tare weights. United States weight laws under the Federal Bridge Formula (FBF) require a three-axle ready mixed concrete truck to weigh 48,000 pounds (22,000 kg) or under. This leaves only 18,000 pounds (8,200 kg) for concrete to be carried, as 30,000 pounds (14,000 kg) is the tare weight of the truck.

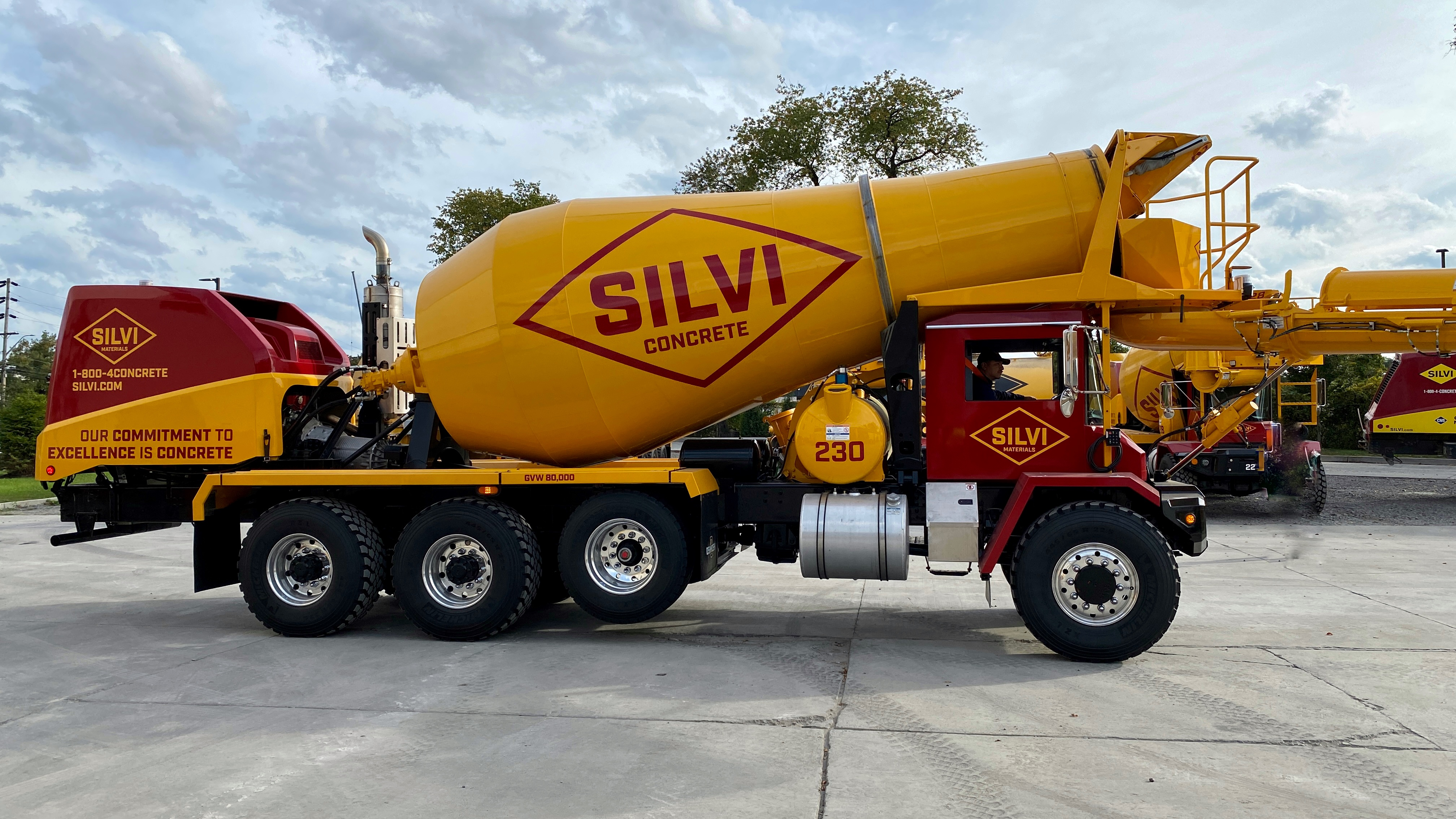
Silvi Materials front-discharge concrete mixer truck with three lift axles including one tag axle. This concrete truck was manufactured by Oshkosh Inc.

A man cleans his concrete mixer truck in Japan

"Rear discharge" trucks require both a driver and a "chuteman" to guide the truck and chute back and forth to place concrete in the manner suitable to the contractor. Newer "front discharge" trucks use a rear engine and have controls inside the cab of the truck to allow the driver to move the chute in all directions. The first front discharge mixer, patented in 1974, was designed and built by Royal W. Sims of Holladay, Utah, United States.

Concrete mixers are equipped with two or more axles. Four-, five- and six-axle trucks are the most common, with the number being determined by the load and local legislation governing allowable loads on the road.

The axles are necessary to distribute the load evenly, allow operation on weight-restricted roads, and reduce wear and tear on normal roads. A two- or three-axle truck during the winter when road weight limits are reduced has no usable payload in many jurisdictions. Other areas may require expensive permits to operate.

Additional axles other than those used for steering ("steers") or drivetrain ("drives") may be installed between the steers and drives, or behind the drives. Mixers commonly have multiple steering axles as well, which generally result in very large turning radii. To facilitate maneuvering, the additional axles may be "lift axles", which allows them to be raised off the ground so that they do not scrub (get dragged sideways across the ground) on tight turns, or increase the vehicle's turning radius. Axles installed behind the drives are known as "tag axles" or "booster axles", and are often equipped to turn opposite to the steering axle to reduce scrubbing and automatically lift when the truck is put into reverse gear.

Tractor trailer combination mixers where the mixer is installed on a trailer instead of a truck chassis are used in some jurisdictions, such as the province of Quebec where even six-axle trucks would have trouble carrying a useful load.

Concrete mixers generally do not travel far from their plant, as the concrete begins to set as soon as it is in the truck. Many contractors require that the concrete be in place within 90 minutes after loading. Some trucks in dry climates are equipped with the capability of adding water in spray form during the trip, especially on long trips. If the truck breaks down or for some other reason the concrete hardens in the truck, workers may need to enter the barrel with jackhammers or the company has to scrap the entire drum.

Stephen Stepanian filed a patent application for the first truck mixer in 1916.

Trucks weigh 9,100 to 14,000 kilograms (20,000 to 30,000 lb), and can carry roughly 20,000 kilograms (40,000 lb) of concrete although many varying sizes of mixer truck are currently in use. The most common truck capacity is 10 cubic yards (7.6 m^{3}).

Most concrete mixers in the UK are limited to a speed of 90 kilometres per hour (56 mph).

=== Concrete mixer trailers ===
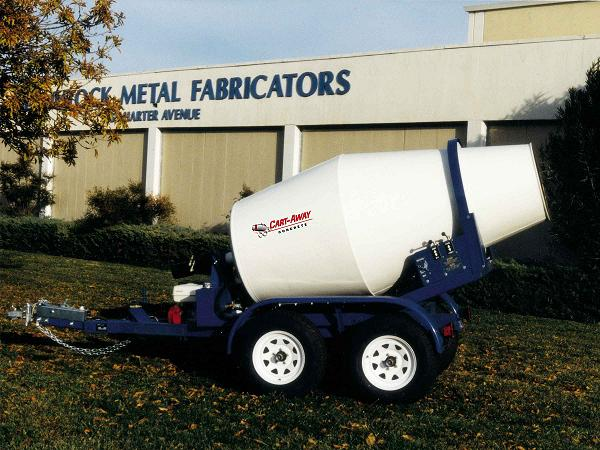
0.75 m³ (1 cubic yard) cart-away mixing trailer

A variant of standard concrete transportation is the concrete (or, cement) mixing trailer. These small versions of transit-mix trucks are used to supply short loads of concrete. They have a concrete mixing drum with a capacity of between 0.76 and 1.34 cubic metres (1 and 1.75 cu yd). Cart-aways are usually pulled behind a pick-up truck and batched from smaller batching systems. The mixing trailer system is popular with rental yards and building material locations, which use them to supply ready-mix to their regular customer base.

=== Metered concrete trucks ===
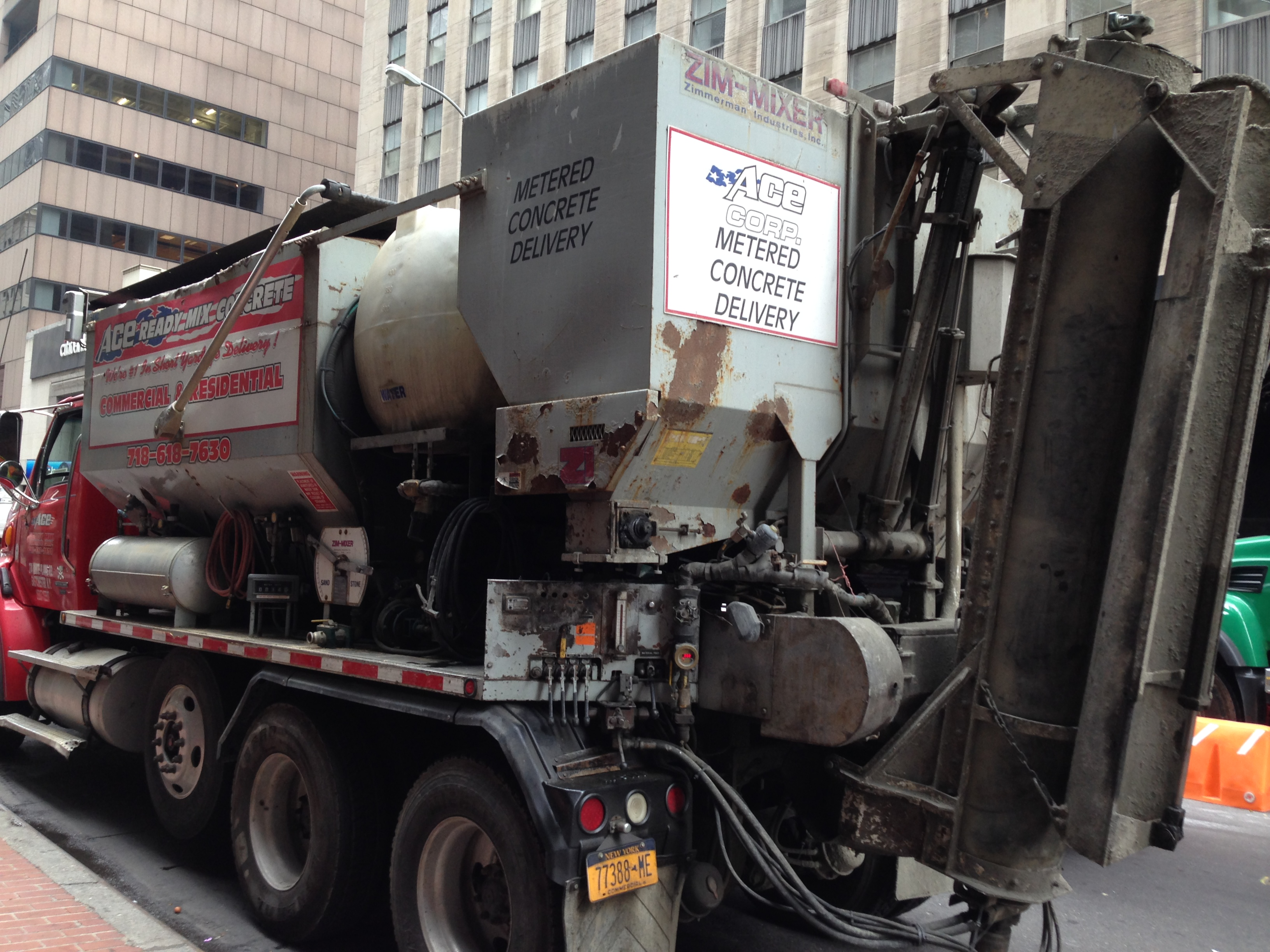
Metered concrete truck

Metered concrete trucks or volumetric mobile mixers contain concrete ingredient materials and water to be mixed on the truck at the job site to make and deliver concrete according to the amount needed.

== On-site and portable concrete mixers ==
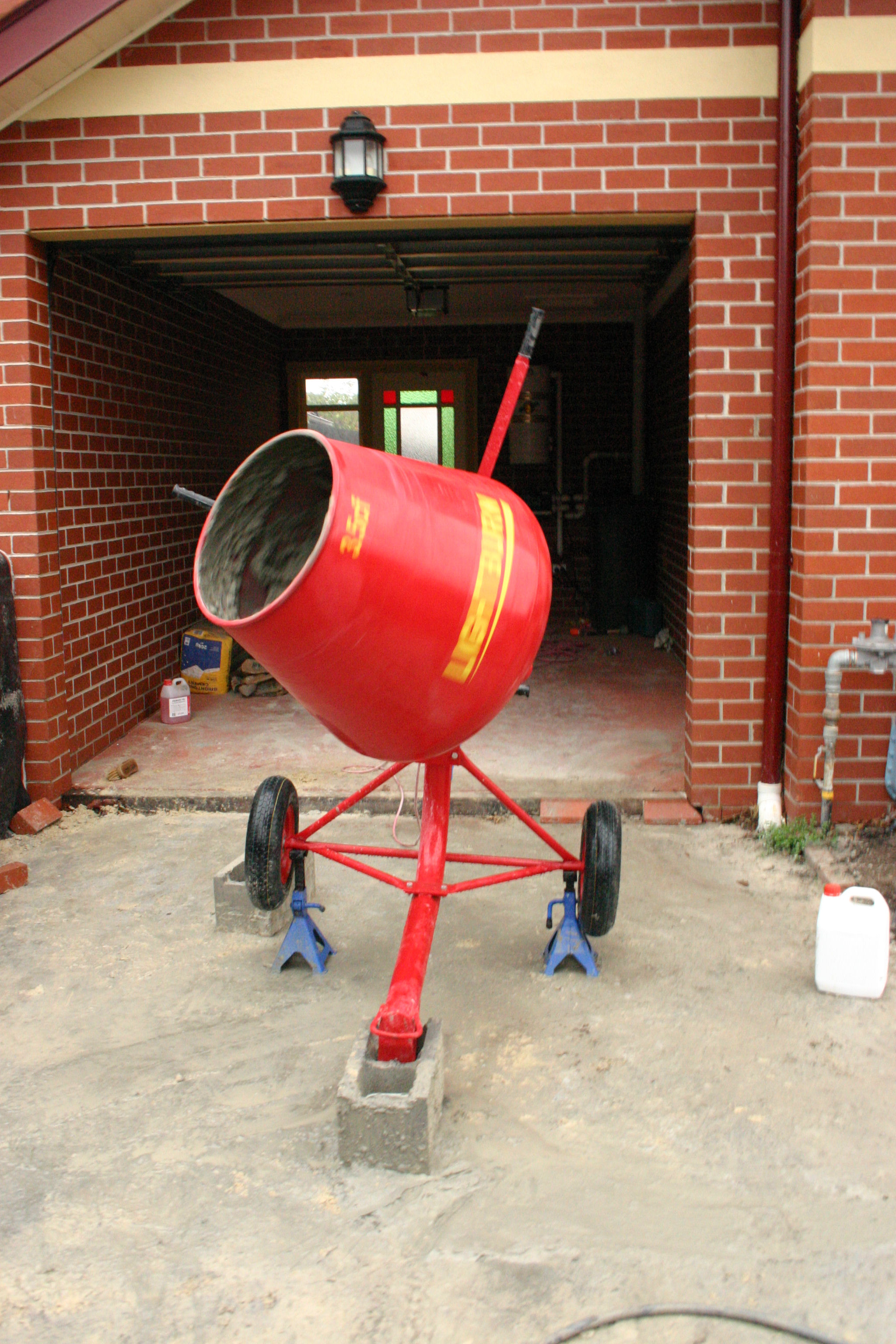
This portable concrete/mortar mixer has wheels and a towing tongue so that it can be towed by a motor vehicle and moved around the worksite by hand, and its rotation is powered by mains electricity. The lever allows the concrete/mortar to be tipped into a wheelbarrow.

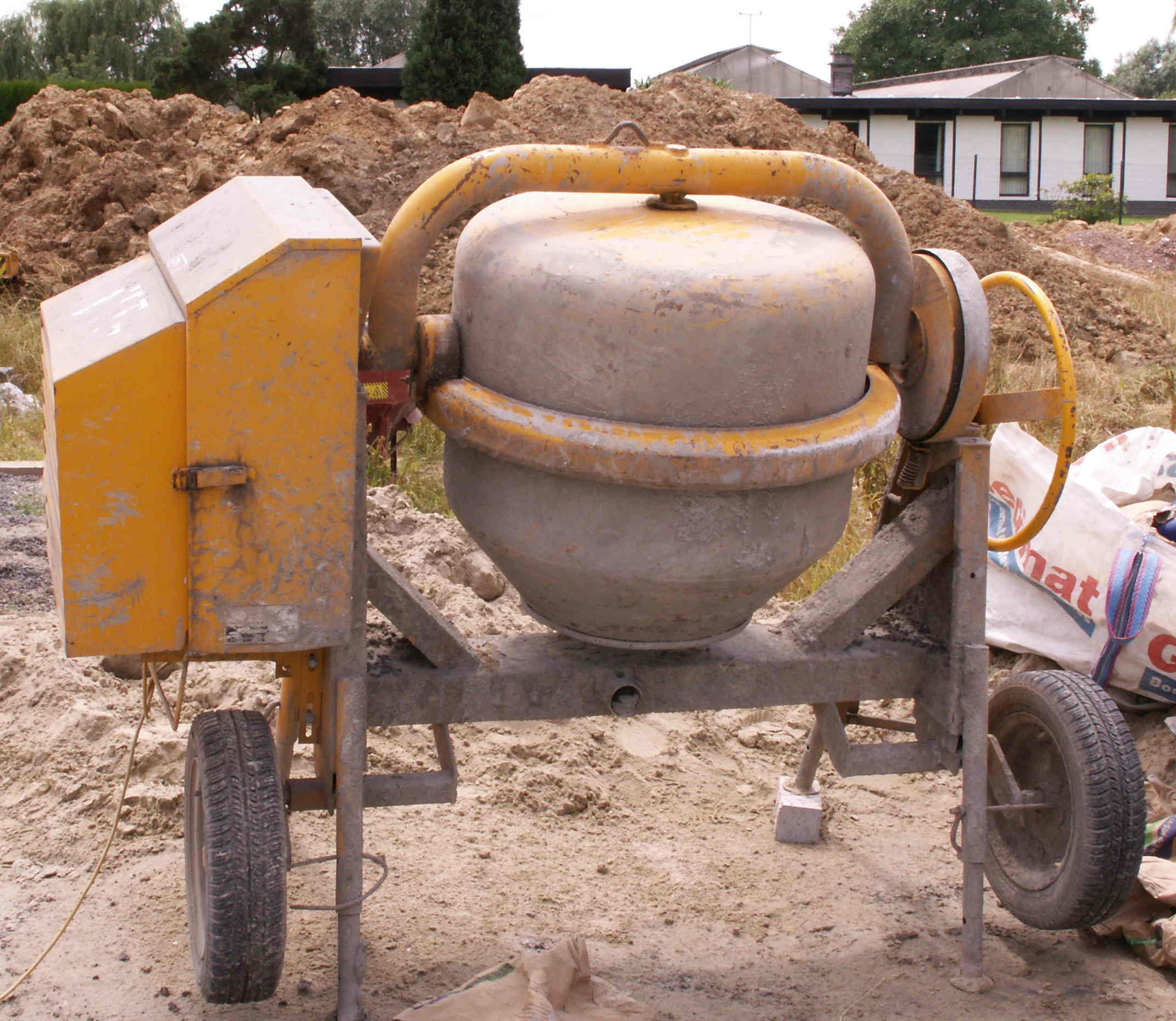
An outdated model of a small-scale concrete mixer. These older mixers are heavy and can not be moved as easily. They are still self-powered with Petter engines and electric motors.

For smaller jobs, such as residential repairs, renovations, or hobbyist-scale projects, many cubic yards of concrete are usually not required. Bagged cement is readily available in small-batch sizes, and aggregate and water are easily obtained in small quantities for the small work site. To service this small-batch concrete market, many types of small portable concrete mixers are available.

A typical portable concrete mixer uses a small revolving drum to mix the components. For smaller jobs the concrete made at the construction site has no time lost in transport, giving the workers ample time to use the concrete before it hardens.

Portable concrete mixers may be powered by gasoline engines, although it is more common that they are powered by electric motors using standard mains current.

These concrete mixers are further divided based on their loading mechanism. Cement, sand and other aggregates are loaded in a hydraulically operated hopper and then poured into the mixing drum for final mixing. They can be unloaded by tilting the drum. In hand-feed concrete mixers, cement, sand and other aggregates are directly added to the mixing drum manually. Both of these types of concrete mixers are popular in construction activities in Africa, some Middle Eastern countries and in the Indian subcontinent.

== Self-loading concrete mixers ==
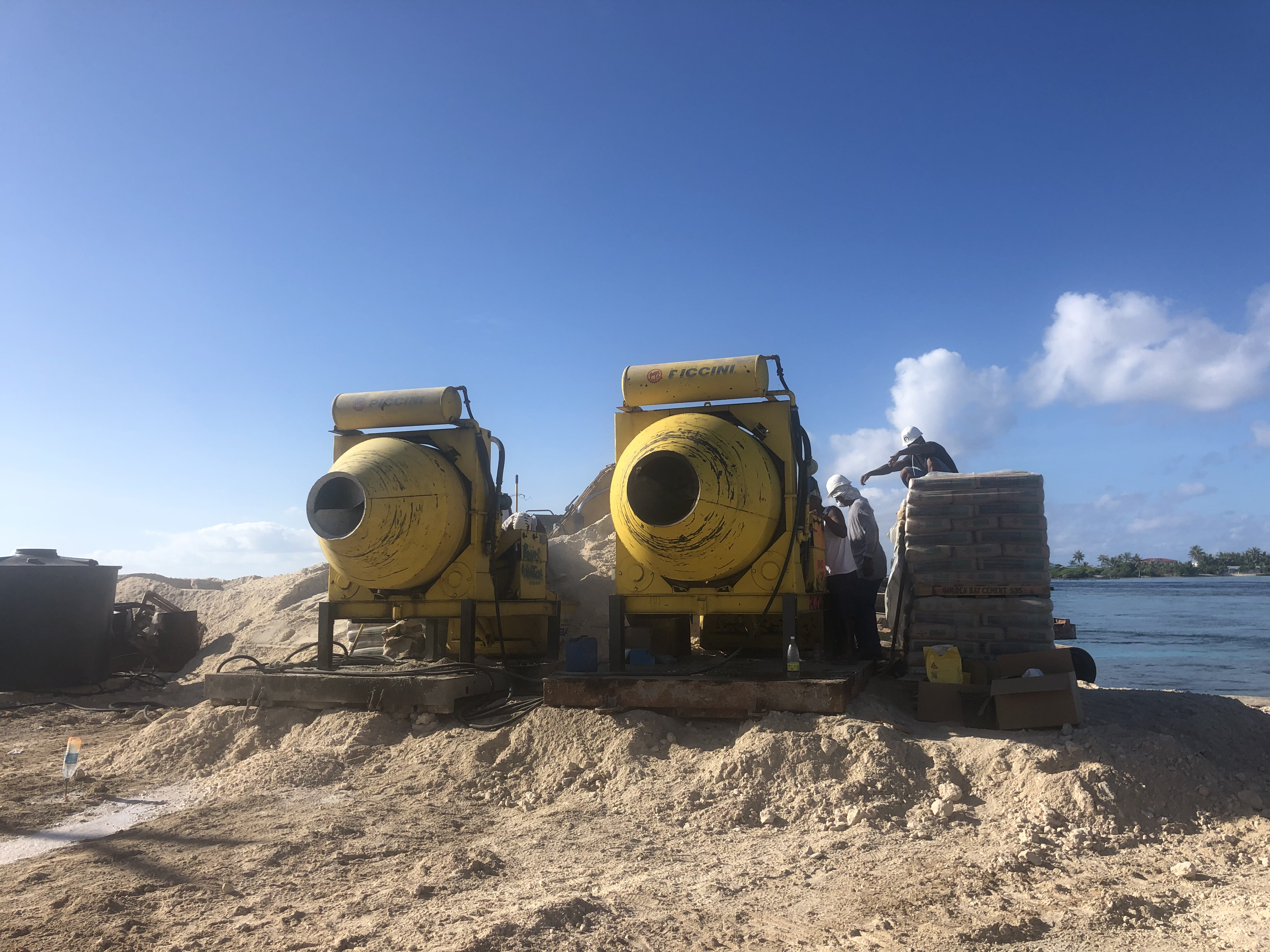
Two concrete mixers (Arutua)

Self-loading concrete mixers are unique machines designed to batch, mix and transport concrete. They consist of a rotating drum mounted on an operator-driven cab-mounted chassis frame fitted with a loading bucket.

The operator of the self-loading concrete mixers batches and introduces the ingredients required for mixing concrete (cement, stone aggregates etc.) into the drum using the loading bucket. The drum is usually a reversible type, tilt type or a combination of both. A predetermined volume of water is discharged to the drum via a water dispensing unit. The mixture is rotated at mixing speeds within the drum until the concrete discharges via a fitted chute.

Self-loading concrete mixers are suited for construction sites where concrete batching plants are unavailable, underfoot conditions are not suited for concrete transit mixer trucks or labor availability is scarce or constrained. Applications include urban and rural construction, concrete pavement maintenance, bridge and tunnel construction, township-level highway construction, foundation construction, national defense facilities, construction of high-speed railways, etc.

== Operating code ==
Operating concrete mixers correctly is one of the biggest safety issues in construction zones. Workers whose tasks are related to concrete processing currently number more than 250,000. Over 10 percent of those workers, 28,000, experienced a job-related injury or illness, and 42 died in just one year.

== See also ==
- Mixing paddle
- Types of concrete
- Concrete plant
