= Paddling =

Manually propelling a boat using a paddle

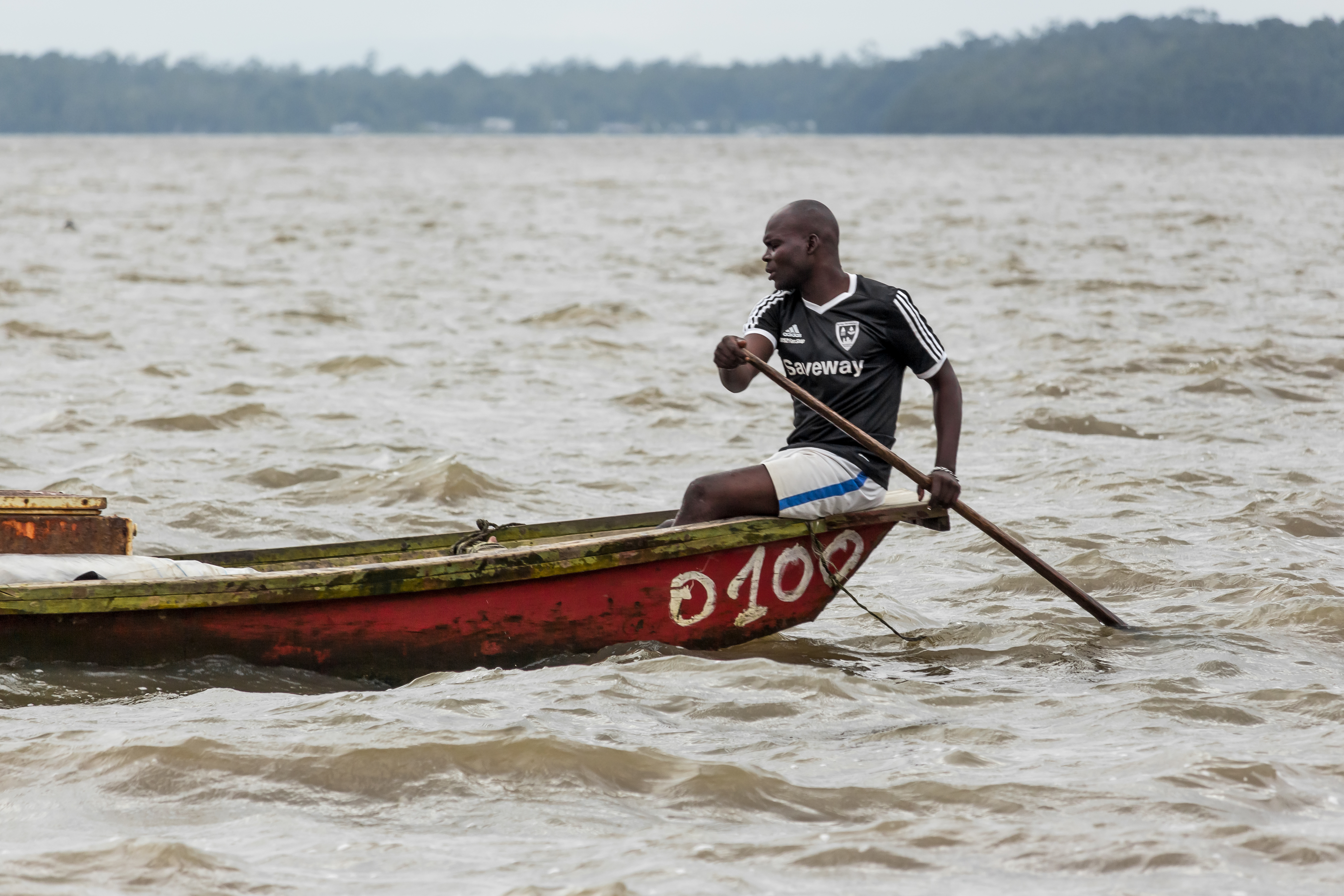
Man paddling a canoe

Paddling, in regard to waterborne transport, is the act of propelling a human-powered watercraft using at least one hand-held paddle, or paddling directly with the hands (without a paddle) as in traditional paddleboarding (also known as prone paddleboarding). The paddle, which consists of one or two blades joined to a shaft, is also used to steer the vessel via generating a difference in propulsion between the two sides of the watercraft. The paddle is not connected to the boat, unlike in rowing where the oar is attached to the boat.

In paddling sports such as canoeing and kayaking, the characteristics that are most important include "dynamic balance, core stability, pulling power, speed, endurance, stature, and rhythm".

== Canoeing ==
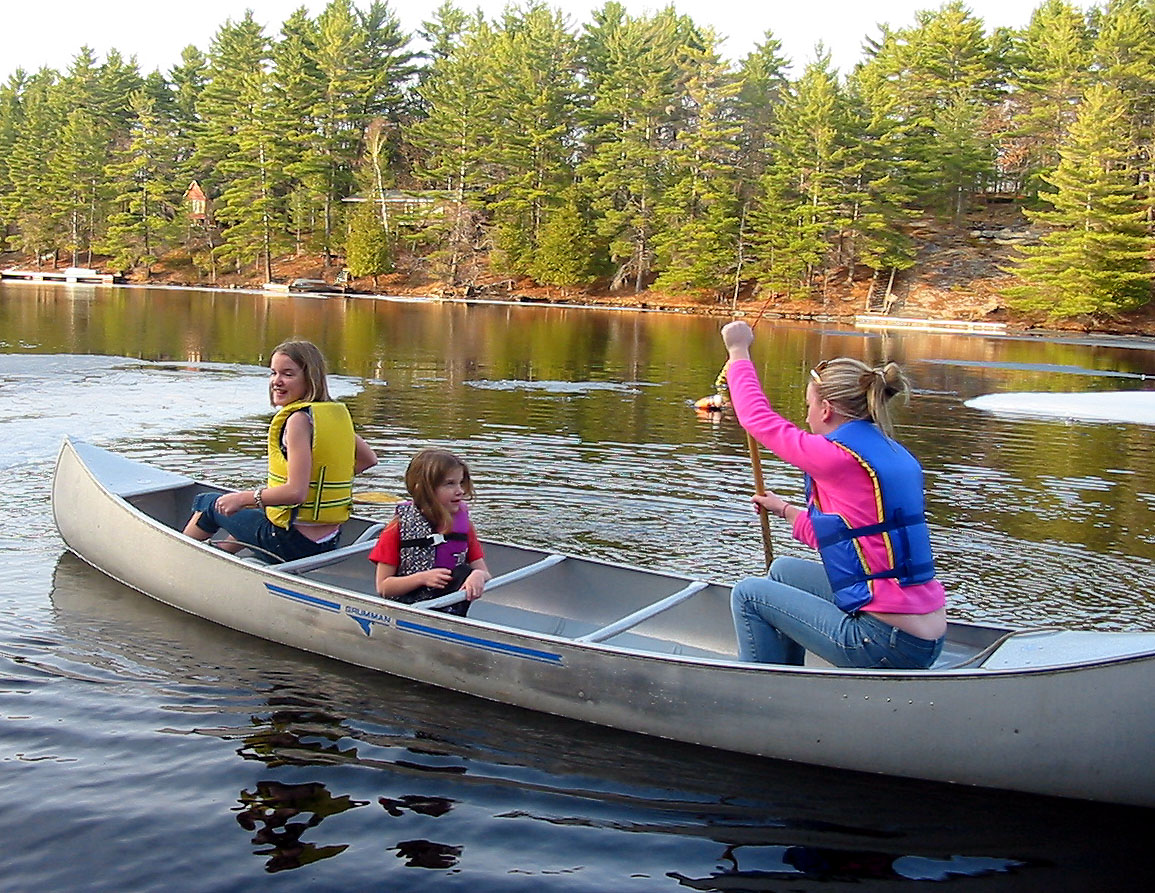
A family in a canoe

Canoeing is the activity of paddling a canoe for leisure, navigation or exploration. In America the term refers exclusively to using one or more single blades or paddles to propel a canoe. In the United Kingdom and some other countries in Europe however, canoeing is also used to refer to kayaking, and canoeing is then often called Canadian canoeing to distinguish canoeing from kayaking.

There are sub-varieties of canoeing, such as touring and whitewater or wildwater canoeing, and outrigger canoeing. Traveling in a whitewater raft can involve using either paddles, or a pair of oars, or both.

Outrigger canoe racing is a team paddling sport which uses the outrigger canoe.

== Kayaking ==
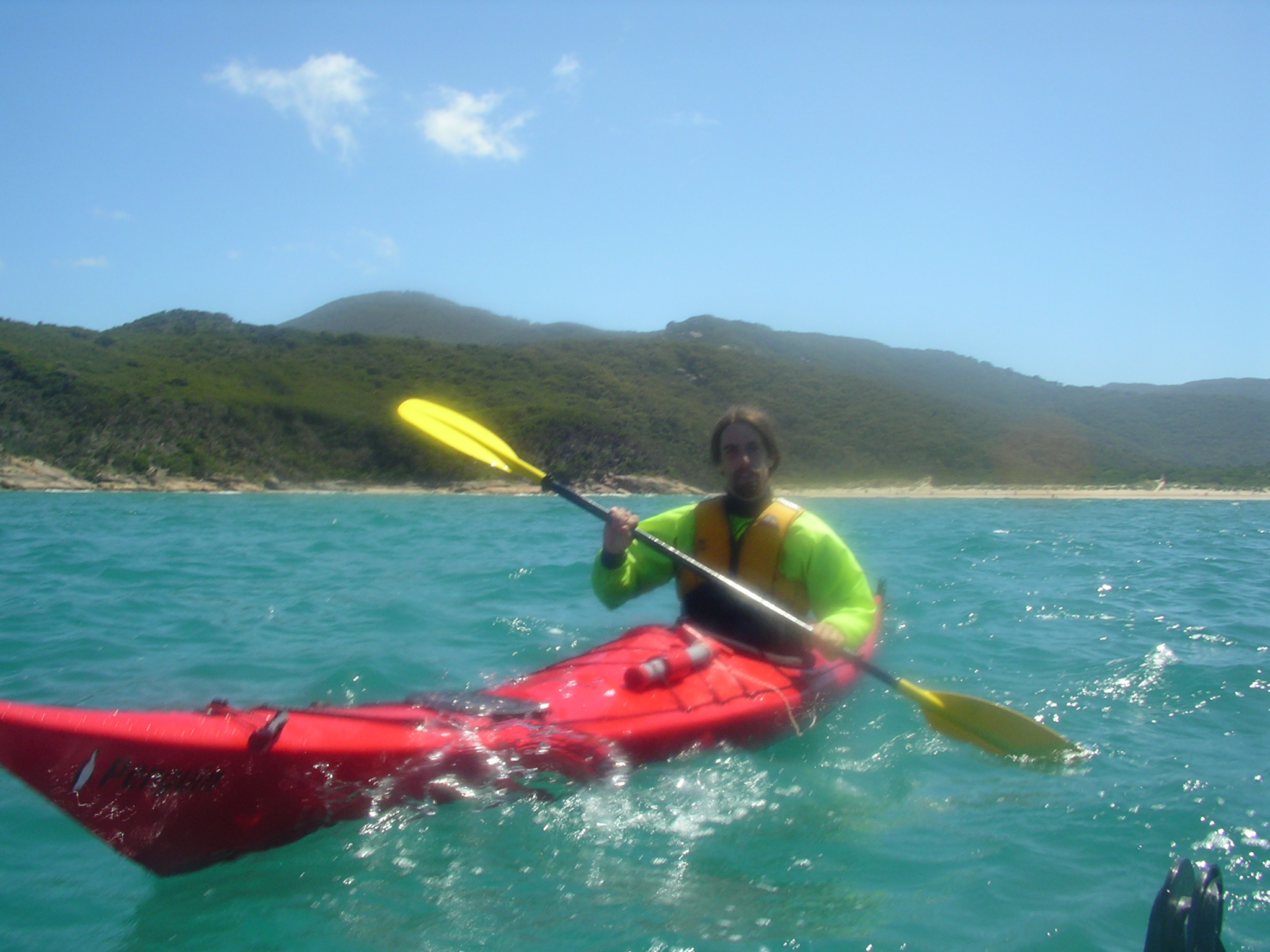
Sea Kayaking at Wilsons Promontory in Victoria, Australia

Kayaking is the use of a kayak for moving across water. Kayaking is differentiated from canoeing by the fact kayakers use a double bladed paddle and sit in a seat with their legs extended out in front of them. Kayakers will either sit on an elevated bench seat or kneel directly on the bottom of the boat with two knees or one knee in the "high kneel" posture.

The kayak may be either "sit-in" (have a closed cockpit) or "sit-on-top" (sitting on top of the boat deck). Sit-in kayaks provide more protection from water and the elements, and are popular for day trips and touring. Sit-on-top kayaks are growing in popularity for fishing and surfing.

== Dragon boating ==
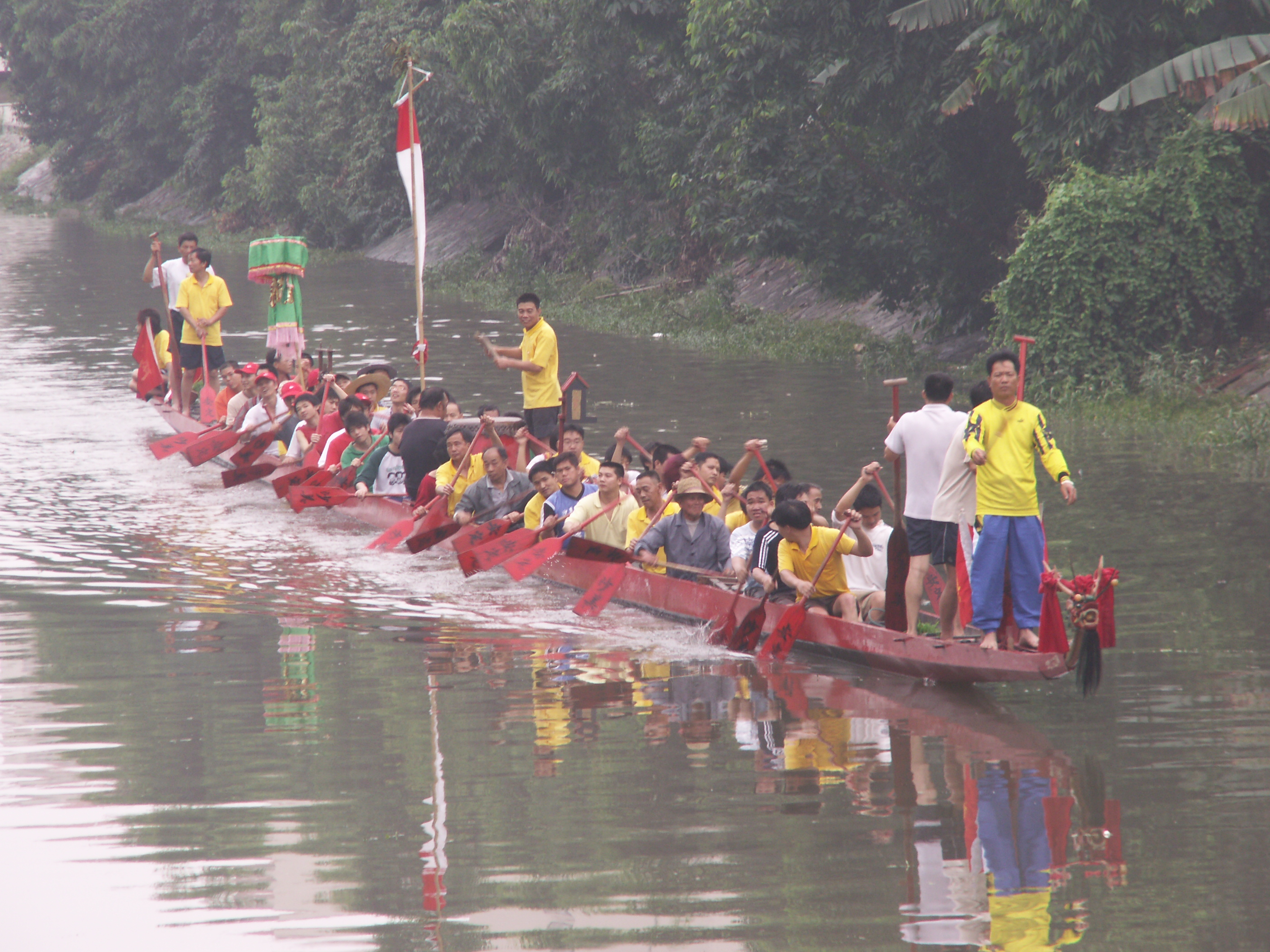
Cantonese dragon boat

A dragon boat is a long and narrow human powered boat used in the team paddling sport of dragon boat racing which originated in China.

For racing events, dragon boats are not rigged with full decorative Chinese dragon heads and tails and are not required to carry a large drum aboard. The decorative boats are used in ceremonial events. They do however use smaller and lighter dragon heads and tails and drum for racing. They are not normally used during practice.

== Rafting ==
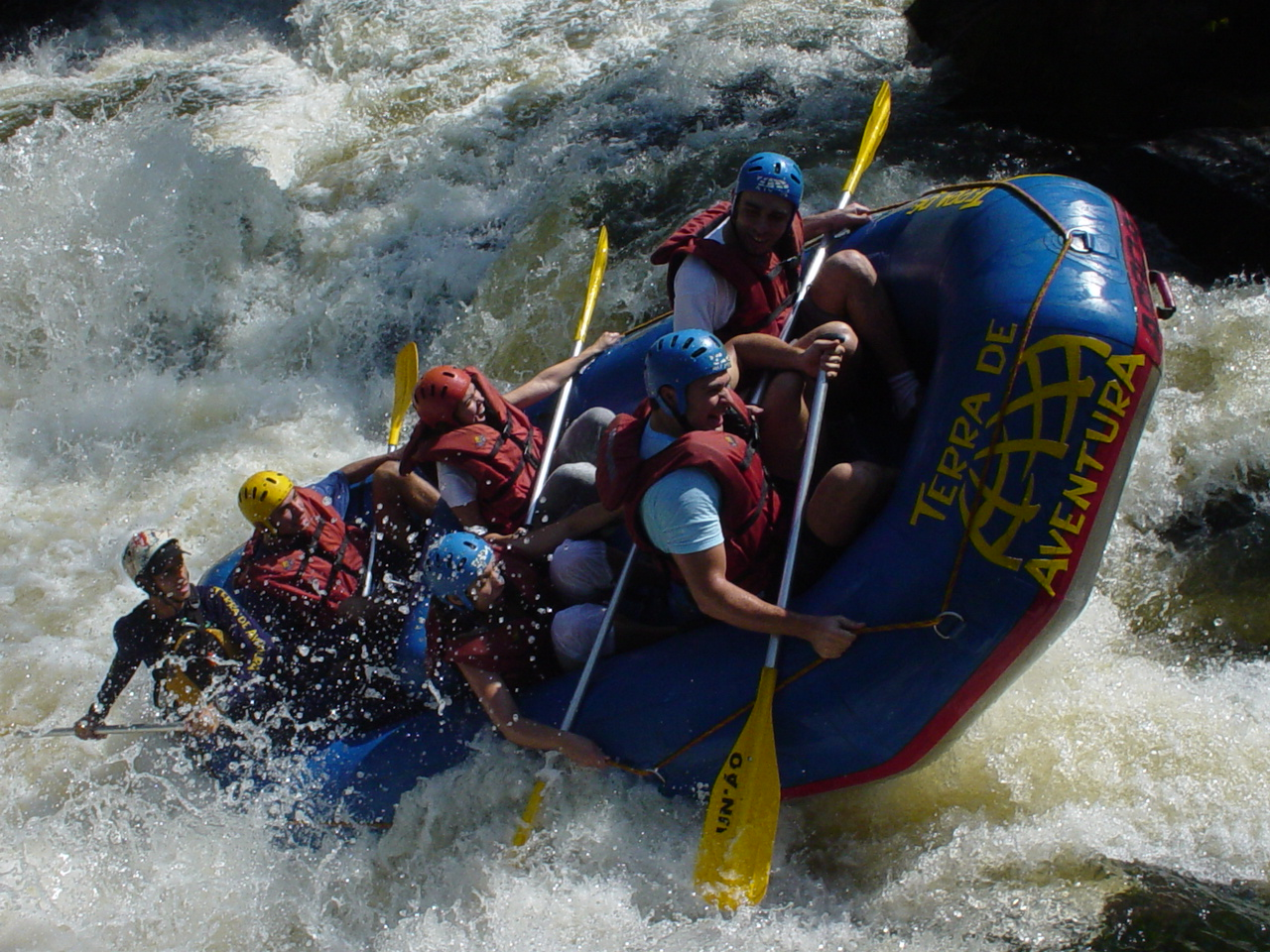
Rafting in Brazil.

Rafting or whitewater rafting uses a raft to navigate a river or other bodies of water. This is usually done on whitewater or different degrees of rough water, in order to thrill and excite the raft passengers. The development of this activity as a leisure sport has become popular since the mid-1970s.

== Paddle surfing and stand-up paddleboarding ==
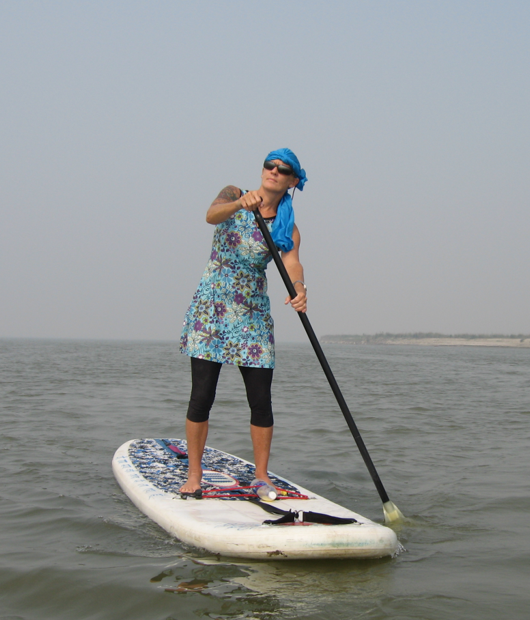
Stand-up paddleboarding on the Ganges River

Stand-up paddleboards (SUPs), are steered with a singled bladed paddle. Originating in Hawaii to help navigate the waves, the sport has grown to include flat water lakes, easy rivers, and spring runs. Traditional paddleboarding is done kneeling on a board and paddling with the hands.

== Surfing ==
Surfing begins when the surfer paddles from the shore in an attempt to catch a wave.
