= Mixing paddle =

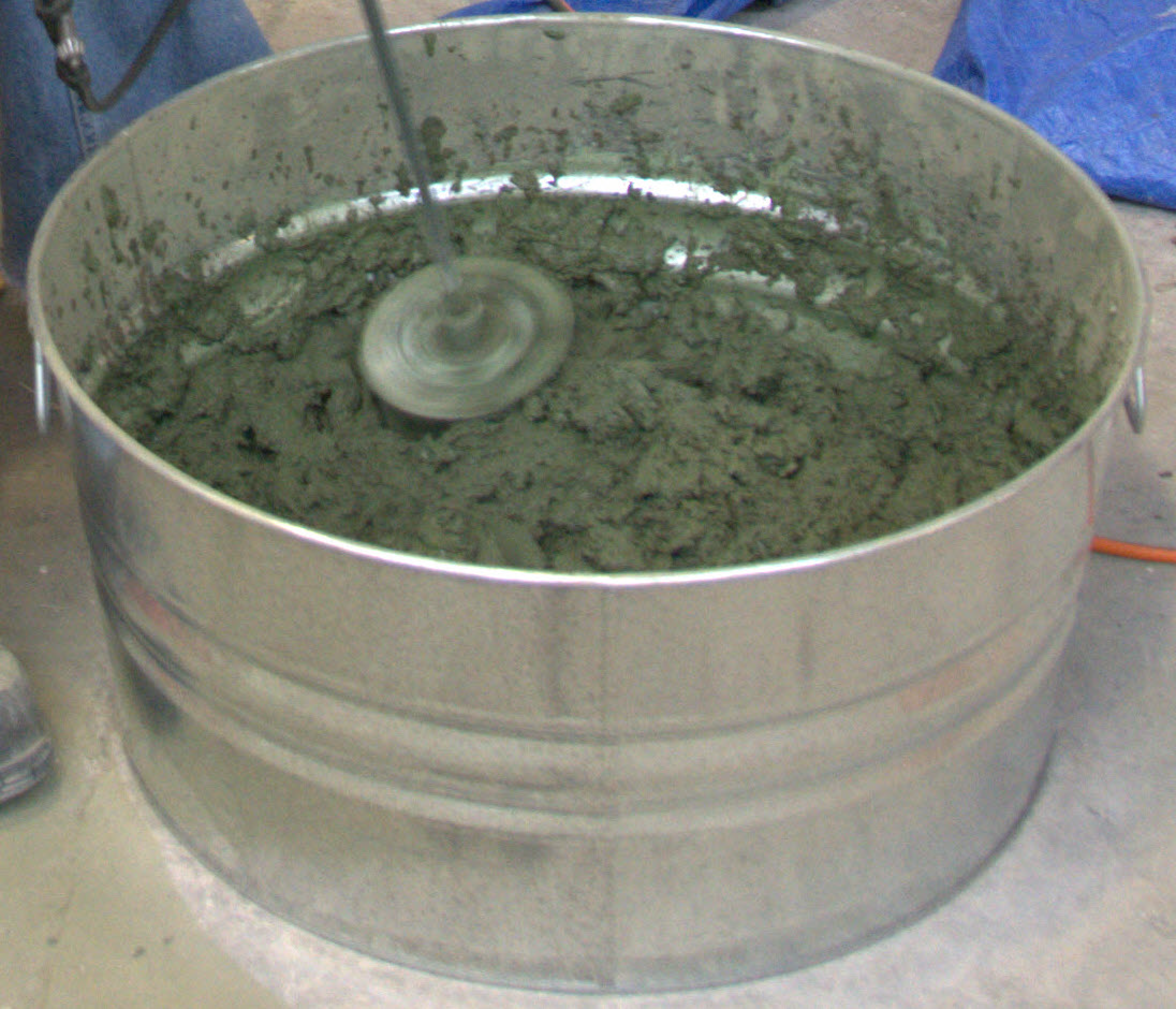
Firestop mortar being mixed with water in a galvanised sheet metal tub, using a professional grout mixing paddle.

A mixing paddle is a shaped device, typically mounted on a shaft, which can be inserted on the shaft end into a motorised drive, for the purpose of mixing liquids, solids or both. Paddle mixers may also be used for kneading. Whilst mounted in fixed blending equipment, the paddle may also be referred to as an agitator.

== Purpose ==
Mixing paddles are used for mixing ingredients in cooking and for mixing construction products, such as pastes, slurries or paints. They are also used for dispersing solids within liquids (for example, some polymers may be delivered in solid form, but will dissolve in liquids).

== Examples ==
- Professional grout mixing paddle
- Paint mixing paddle
- Mudwhip (mostly used for drywall mud)

== Gallery ==
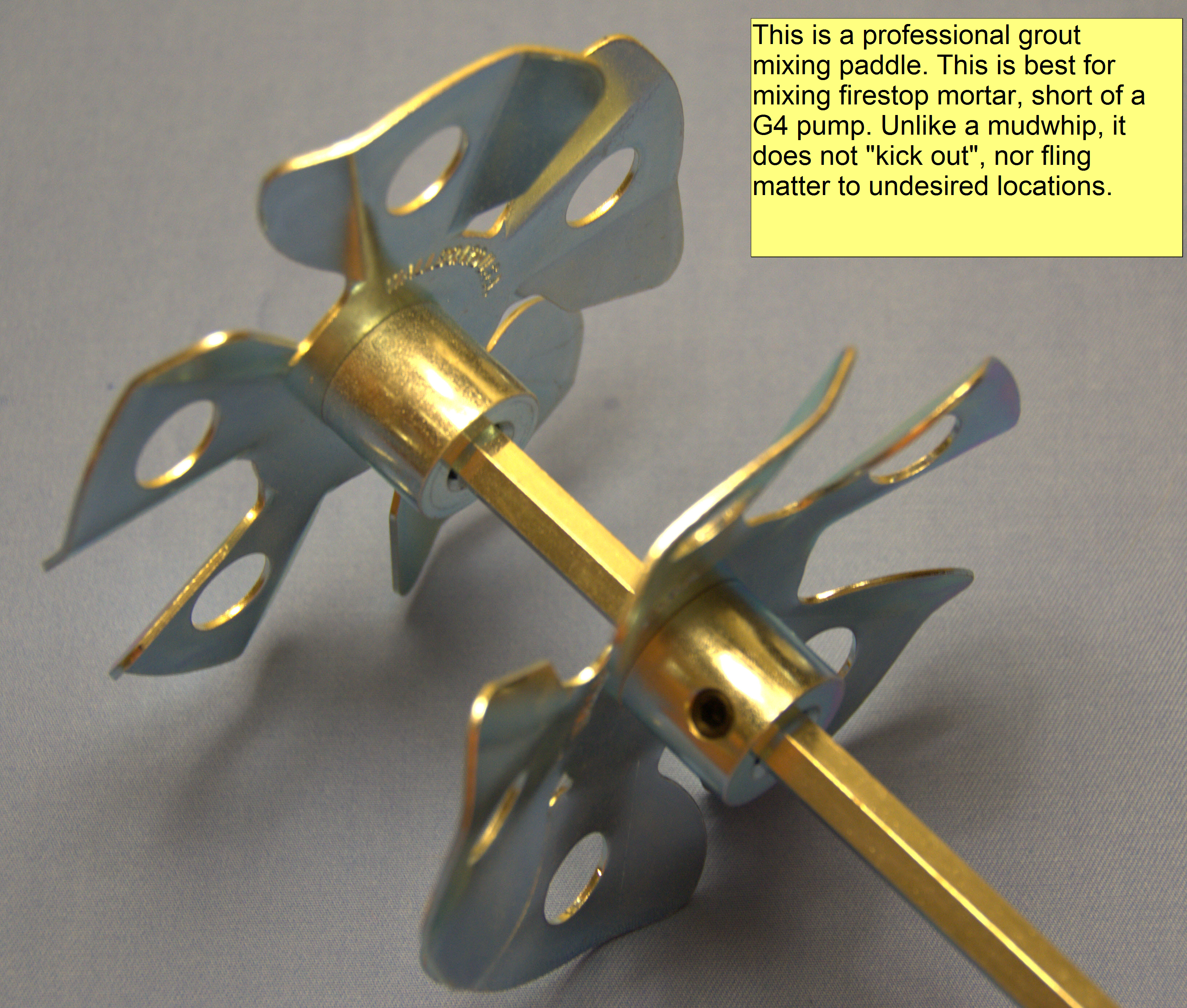
Grout mixing paddle.

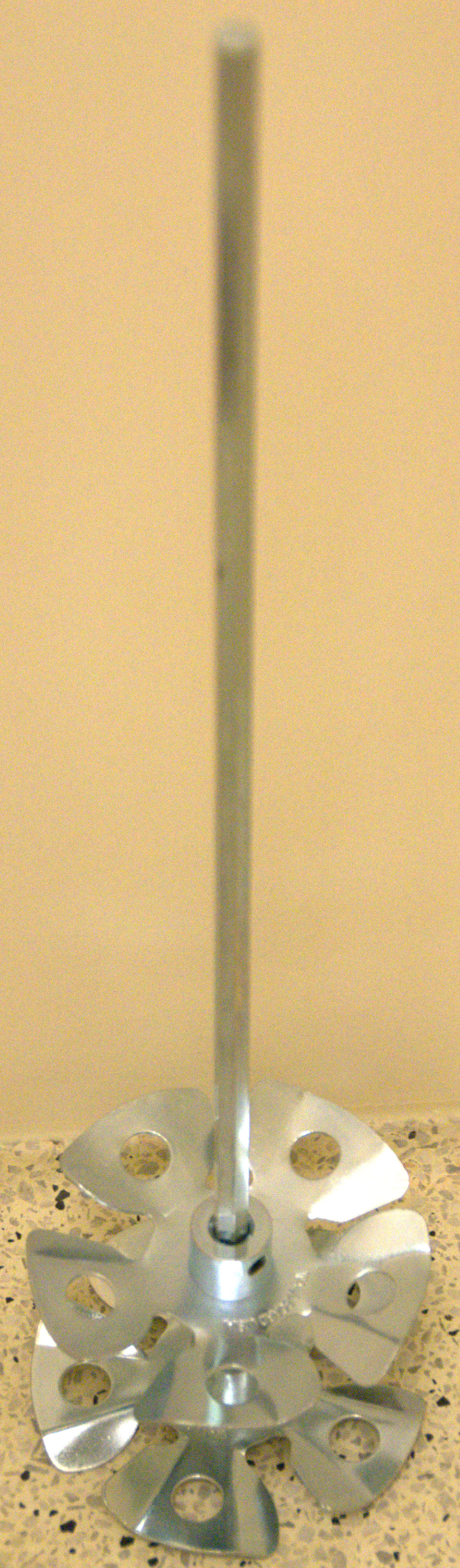
Grout mixing paddle, standing.

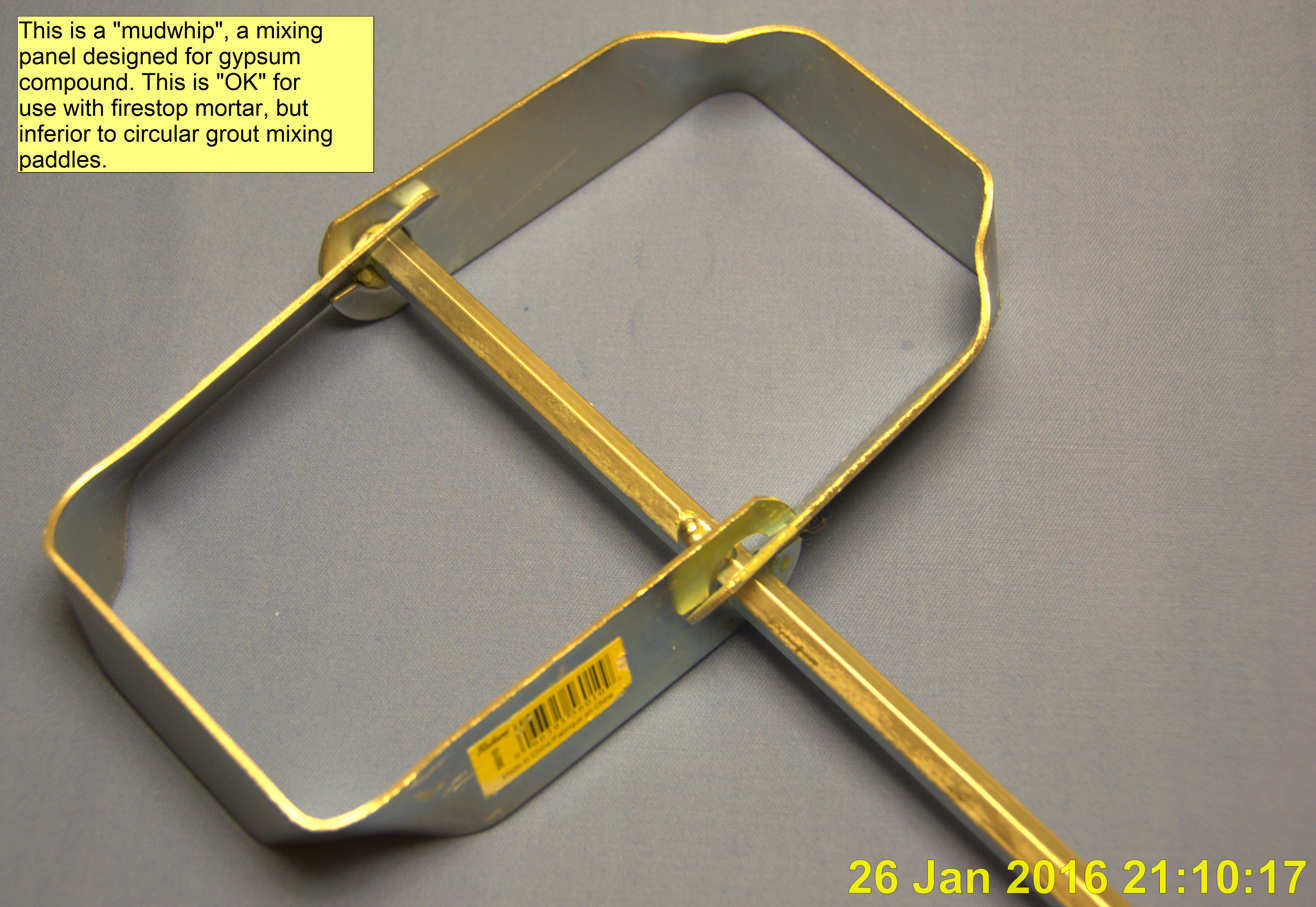
Mudwhip – typically used for drywall mud.

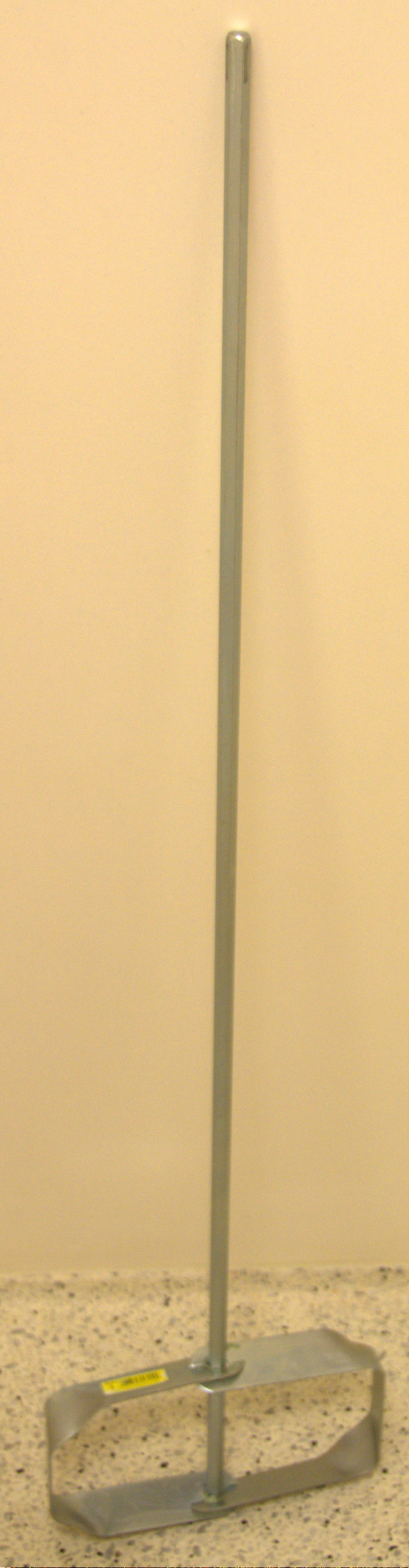
Mudwhip, standing.

Mixing vessel with fixed paddle or agitator

== See also ==
- Concrete mixer
