= Concrete plant =

Equipment that combines various ingredients to form concrete

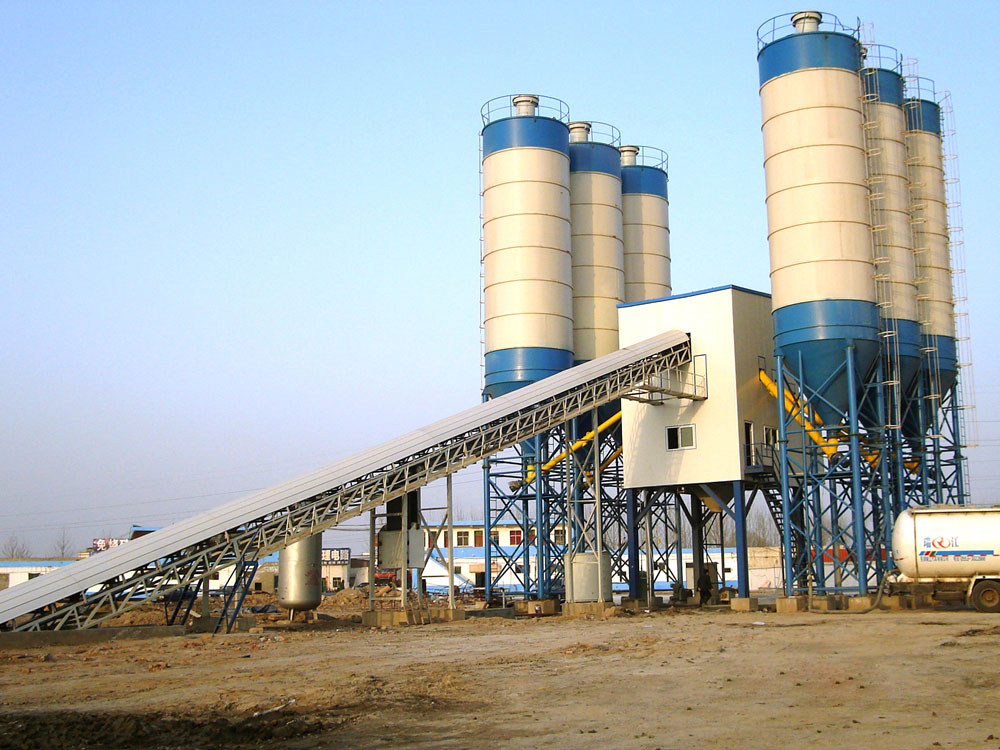
A typical non-North American design of concrete plant. Longer conveyors and screw-fed cementitious materials slow down production significantly.

A concrete plant, also known as a batch plant or batching plant or a concrete batching plant, is equipment that combines various ingredients to form concrete. Some of these inputs include water, air, admixtures, sand, aggregate (rocks, gravel, etc.), fly ash, silica fume, slag, and cement. A concrete plant can have a variety of parts and accessories, including: mixers (either tilt drum or horizontal, or in some cases both), cement batchers, aggregate batchers, conveyors, radial stackers, aggregate bins, cement bins, heaters, chillers, cement silos, batch plant controls, and dust collectors.

The heart of the concrete batching plant is the mixer, and there are many types of mixers, such as tilt drum, pan, planetary, single shaft and twin shaft. The twin shaft mixer can ensure an even mixture of concrete through the use of high horsepower motors, while the tilt mixer offers a comparatively large batch of concrete mix. In North America, the predominant central mixer type is a tilt drum style, while in Europe and other parts of the world, a twin shaft mixer is more prevalent. A pan or planetary mixer is more common at a precast plant.

Aggregate bins have 2 to 6 compartments for storage of various sand and aggregate (rocks, gravel, etc.) sizes, while cement silos are typically one or two compartments, but at times up to 4 compartments in a single silo. Conveyors are typically between 24 and 48 inches wide and carry aggregate from the ground hopper to the aggregate bin, as well as from the aggregate batcher to the charge chute.

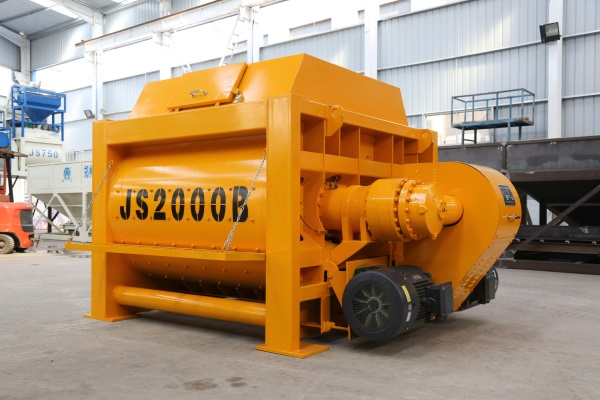
A twin shaft concrete mixer, which is common in concrete plants

The aggregate batcher, also named aggregate bins, is used for storage and to batch the sand, gravel and crushed stone of the concrete plant. There are also many types of aggregate batchers, but most of them measure aggregate by weighing. Some use a weighing hopper, some use a weighing belt.

The cement silos are indispensable devices in the production of concrete. They mainly store bulk cement, fly ash, mineral powder and others. There are three types of cement silos: bolted cement silos, horizontal cement silos and integrated cement silos. Integrated cement silos are made in factories and can be used directly. Bolted cement silos are bolted for easy installation and removal. Horizontal cement silos have lower requirements on foundations and can be transported by truck or flatbed without disassembly.

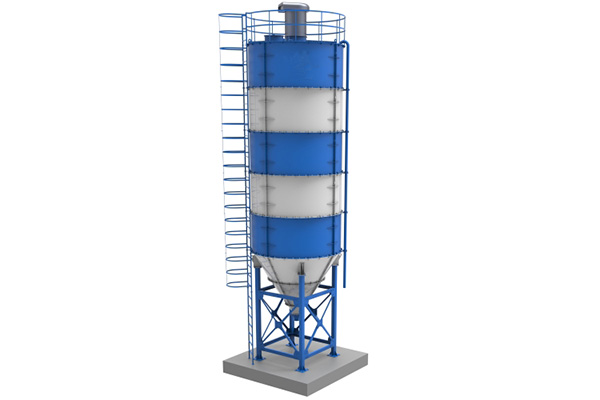
Cement silo

The screw conveyor is a machine to transfer the materials from the cement silos to the powder weighing hopper.

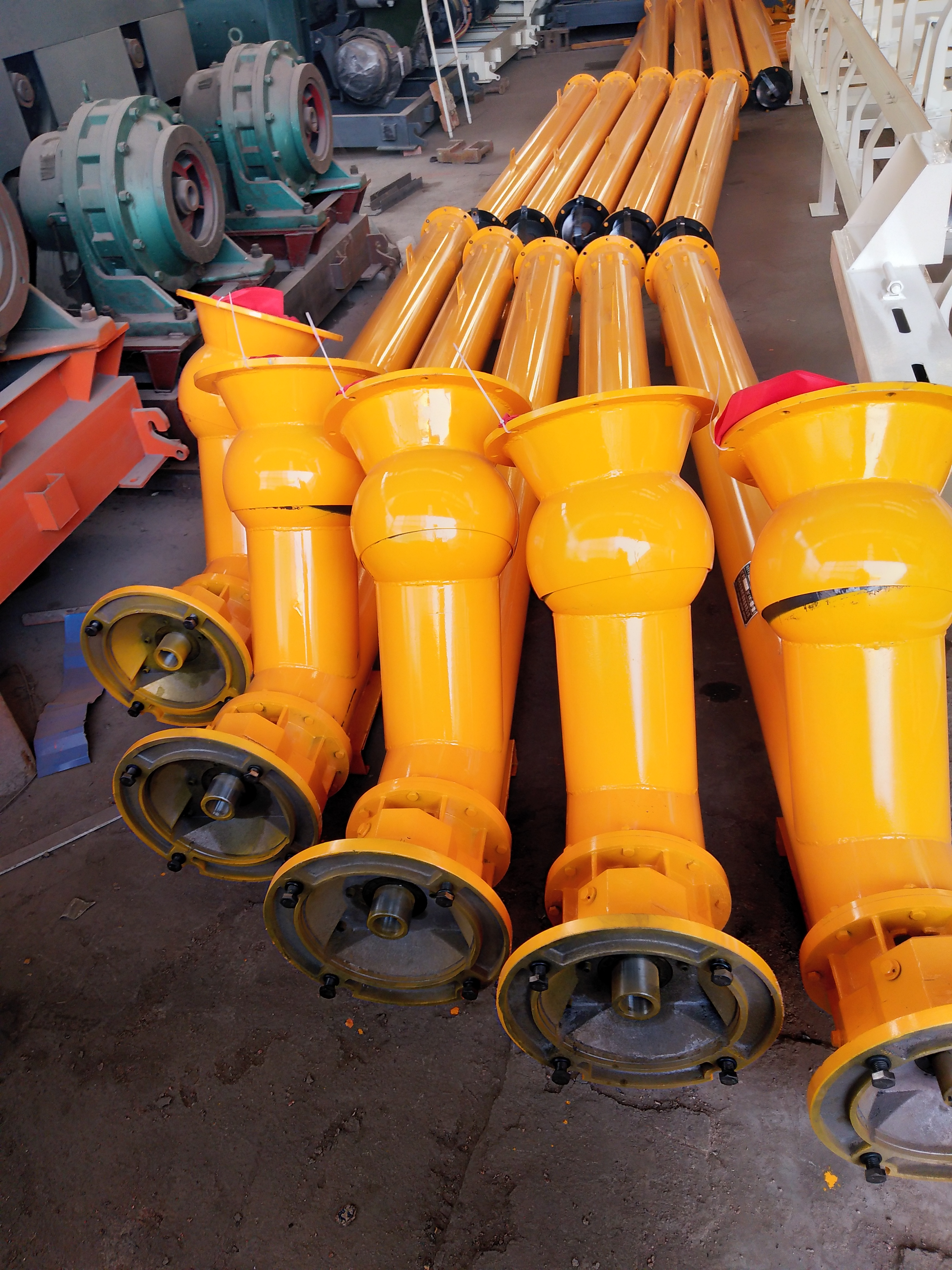
Screw conveyor

Concrete plants use the control system to control the working of the machine. Concrete batch plants employ computer-aided control to assist in fast and accurate measurement of input constituents or ingredients. With concrete performance so dependent on accurate water measurement, systems often use digital scales for cementitious materials and aggregates, and moisture probes to measure aggregate water content as it enters the aggregate batcher to automatically compensate for the mix design water/cement ratio target. Many producers find moisture probes work well only in sand, and with marginal results on larger-sized aggregate.

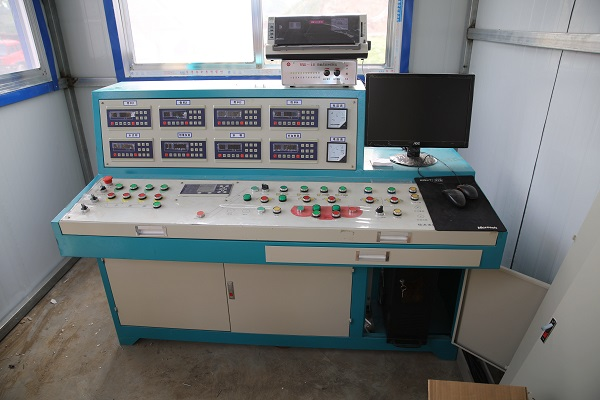
Automatic control system

== Types ==
There are many classification standards for concrete plants. Concrete plants can be divided into dry mix plants and wet mixing plants, depending on whether a central mixer is used. They can also be divided into stationary concrete plants and mobile concrete plants, depending on whether they can be moved. Different methods of batching create further distinctions between concrete plants. For example, there are repose batching plants, inline blending plants, decumulative plants, and continuous blending plants.

=== Repose batching plant ===
Respose batching is the most common method used for ready mixed concrete production in the United States. In this method, coarse aggregates and sand are stored in overhead storage bins. When the batching process begins, a gate is opened at the bottom of the first aggregate to be used in the mix design. The aggregate falls into a weigh hopper below. This gravity-fed flow is regulated by the gate opening and closing as needed until the target weight is reached in the weigh hopper. Then, a gate at the bottom of the weigh hopper opens, releasing the weighed aggregate onto a conveyor. The conveyor then transfers the weighed aggregate to a mixer, typically a truck-mounted drum mixer. This process is then repeated for each additional coarse aggregate and sand. Metered amounts of cement, water, and frequently fly ash are then added into the mixing drum, and the mixing process begins.

=== Inline blending plant ===
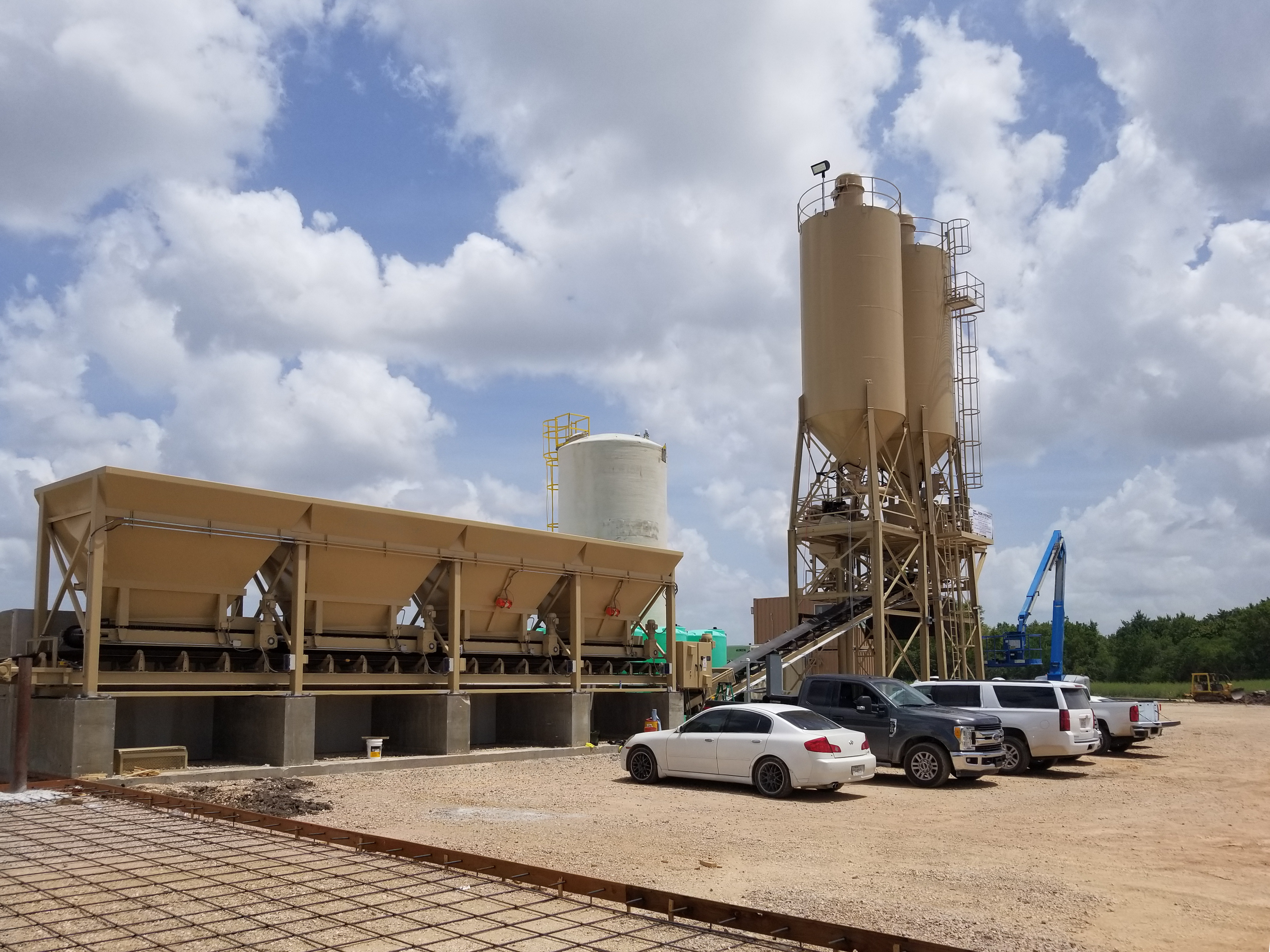
Precision inline blending concrete plant installed in Texas in 2018.

Inline blending plants, also known as precision inline blending plants operate somewhat differently. Coarse aggregates and sand are stored in a series of inline storage bins, typically from 3 to 5 bins. Beneath each of these storage bins is a dedicated belt weigher. Beneath the belt weighers is a collecting conveyor that runs the full length of the aggregate blending unit. When the batching process begins, aggregates are weighed by the belt weighers as they are also discharged onto the collecting conveyor. The flow is regulated by the speed of the belt weighers. Once the target weight for each aggregate is reached, the belt weigher simply stops. All aggregates in the mix design are weighed simultaneously, rather than one at a time. In this process, the aggregates are also blended, as each stream of weighed aggregates passes underneath the belt weigher of the next aggregate in sequence. This creates a dense, interlocking mix of graded aggregates. The blended aggregate stream is fed onto a charging conveyor, which transfers the blended aggregates to the mixer. Metered amounts of cement, water, and often fly ash are then added, and the mixing process continues.

=== Dry mix concrete plant ===
A dry mix concrete plant, also known as a transit mix plant, weighs sand, gravel and cement in weigh batchers via digital or manual scales. All the ingredients are then discharged into a chute, which discharges into a truck. Meanwhile, water is either being weighed or volumetrically metered and discharged through the same charging chute into the mixer truck. These ingredients are then mixed for a minimum of 70 to 100 revolutions during transportation to the jobsite.

=== Wet mix concrete plant ===
A wet mix concrete plant combines some or all of the above ingredients (including water) at a central location into a concrete mixer - that is, the concrete is mixed at a single point, and then simply agitated on the way to the jobsite to prevent setting (using agitators or ready mix trucks) or hauled to the jobsite in an open-bodied dump truck. Dry mix plants differ from wet mix plants in that wet mix plants contain a central mixer, which can offer a more consistent mixture in a shorter time (generally 5 minutes or less). Dry mix plants typically see more break strength standard deviation and variation from load to load because of inconsistencies in mix times, truck blade and drum conditions, traffic conditions, etc. With a central mix plant, all loads see the same mixing action and there is an initial quality control point when discharging from the central mixer. Certain plants combine both dry and wet characteristics for increased production or for seasonality. For example, a mobile batch plant can be constructed on a large job site.

=== Mobile concrete plant ===
The mobile batch plant, also known as a portable concrete plant, is a very productive, reliable and cost-effective piece of equipment to produce batches of concrete. It allows the user to batch concrete at almost any location, then move to another location and batch concrete. Portable plants are the best choice for temporary site projects or even stationary locations where the equipment height is a factor or the required production rate is lower.

=== Stationary concrete plant ===
The stationary concrete plant is designed to produce high-quality concrete. It has the advantages of large output, high efficiency, high stability and high specification. Stationary concrete batching plants are reliable and flexible, easy to maintain and have a low failure rate. They are widely used in various projects such as roads and bridges, ports, tunnels, dams and buildings.

== Application ==
Typical concrete plants are used for ready mix, civil infrastructure, and precast applications.

=== For ready mix ===
The global Ready Mix Concrete (RMC) market is valued at US$394.44 billion in 2017 and is expected to reach US$624.82 billion by the end of 2025, growing at a CAGR of 5.92% between 2016 and 2022. A ready mix concrete plant is generally located inside the city, transporting ready-mixed concrete for projects through concrete truck mixers. Ready mix concrete plants have higher requirements for durability, reliability, safety and environmental protection of the concrete plant's system than other types of plant.

=== For precast applications ===
Precast concrete, also named PC component, is a concrete product that is processed in a standardized process in the factory. Compared with cast-in-place concrete, precast concrete can be produced, poured and cured in batches. A precast concrete batching plant has a safer construction environment, lower cost, and high-quality products compared with concrete poured on site; the construction speed can be guaranteed. In addition, it is widely used in transportation, construction, water conservancy and other fields.

Precast and prestress concrete producers supply critical elements used in worldwide infrastructure, including buildings, bridges, parking decks, road surfaces, and retaining walls.

== Dust and water pollution ==
Municipalities, especially in urban or residential areas, have been concerned by pollution from concrete batching plants. The absence of suitable dust collection and filter systems in cement silos or at the truck loading point is the major source of particulate matter emission in the air. The loading point is a large emission point for dust pollution, so many concrete producers use central dust collectors to contain this dust. Notably, many transit mix (dry loading) plants create significantly more dust pollution than central mix plants due to the nature of the batching process. However, inline blending plants generally produce substantially less dust and noise pollution than repose batch plants. A final source of concern for many municipalities is the presence of extensive water runoff and reuse for water spilled on a producer's sites.
