= Terry O'Neill (photographer) =

British photographer (1938–2019)

Terry O'Neill CBE
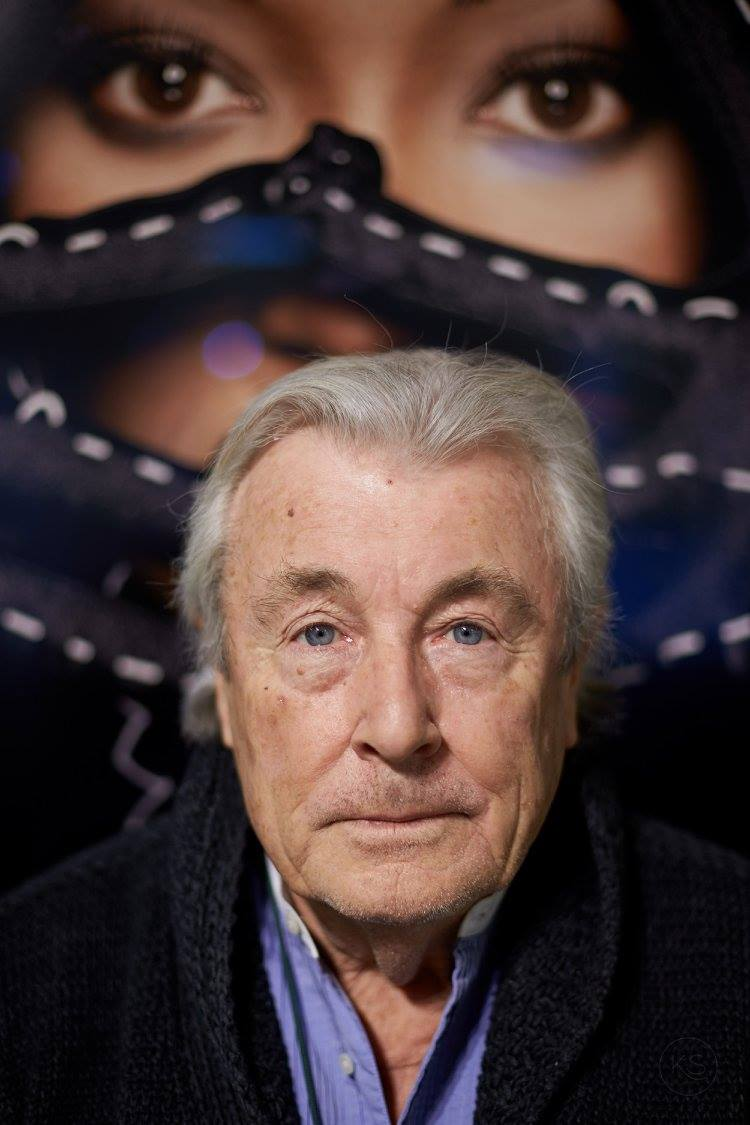
- O'Neill in 2016
- Born: Terence Patrick O'Neill; 30 July 1938; Romford, Essex, England
- Died: 16 November 2019 (aged 81); London, England
- Occupation: Photographer
- Spouses: Vera Day (m. 1963; div. 1976) Faye Dunaway (m. 1982; div. 1987) Laraine Ashton (m. 2001)
- Children: 3
- Website: Official website

Terence Patrick O'Neill (30 July 1938 – 16 November 2019) was a British photographer, known for documenting the fashions, styles, and celebrities of the 1960s. O'Neill's photographs capture his subjects candidly or in unconventional settings.

His work has been featured in numerous exhibitions. He was awarded an honorary fellowship of the Royal Photographic Society in 2004 and the society's Centenary Medal in 2011. His work is held in the collection of the National Portrait Gallery, London.

== Life and career ==
O'Neill was born to Irish parents in Romford, Essex, and began his career working in a photographic unit for an airline at London's Heathrow Airport. During this time, he photographed a sleeping figure in a waiting area who, by happenstance, was revealed to be Home Secretary Rab Butler. O'Neill thereafter found further employment on Fleet Street with The Daily Sketch in 1959. His first professional job was to photograph Laurence Olivier.

During the 1960s, in addition to photographing contemporary celebrities such as Judy Garland, the Beatles and the Rolling Stones, he also photographed members of the British royal family and prominent politicians, showing a more human side to these subjects than had usually been portrayed—his photographs capture his subjects candidly or in unconventional settings.

O'Neill's photographs of Elton John are among his best known. A selection of them appeared in the 2008 book Eltonography. Also considered among his most famous images are a series of American actress Faye Dunaway (his girlfriend at the time) at dawn on 29 March 1977, lounging next to the swimming pool at the Beverly Hills Hotel the morning after winning the Academy Award for Best Actress for Network, with several newspapers scattered around her and her Oscar statuette prominently shown on a table beside her breakfast tray. The series was photographed in both colour and black and white.

O'Neill was credited (as Terrence O'Neill) as an executive producer of the film Mommie Dearest (1981). His only other film credit was for still photography for the opera film Aria (1987).

== Personal life ==
O'Neill was married to the actress Vera Day for 13 years; they had two children together, Keegan Alexander and Sarah Jane. He had a decade-long relationship with Faye Dunaway; they were married for five years in the 1980s and had a son, Liam. In 2003, he was quoted in the US tabloid magazine Star as saying Liam was adopted and not their biological son, contrary to Dunaway's public assertions. In 2001 O'Neill married Laraine Ashton, a former model agency executive.

O'Neill died on 16 November 2019 at his home in London from prostate cancer, at the age of 81.

== Exhibitions ==
- Terry O'Neill: Celebrity, National Portrait Gallery, London, 2003/4
- Photographs by Terry O'Neill, San Francisco Art Exchange, San Francisco, CA, 2005
- Kings and Queens: Photographs by Terry O'Neill, San Francisco Art Exchange, San Francisco, CA, 2007
- Chairman of the Board, Knight of the Realm: Photographs of Frank Sinatra and Sir Elton John, San Francisco Art Exchange, San Francisco, CA, 2009
- Getty Image Gallery, the Village, Westfield London, London, 2009. A retrospective.
- Leeds Gallery, Munro House, Leeds, UK, 2011. A retrospective.
- Terry O'Neill's Rock & Roll Opus, San Francisco Art Exchange, San Francisco, CA, 2014
- Terry O'Neill: Stars, Fotografiska, Stockholm, 2022
- Terry O'Neill: Stars, Fotografiska, New York, 2023
- Famous by Terry O'Neill, Fotomuseum aan het Vrijthof, Maastricht, 2023. Curated by Feiko Koster.

== Books ==
- Legends. Jonathan Cape, 1985. ISBN 9780224028493
- Celebrity. Little, Brown, 2003. ISBN 978-0316724456
- Sinatra: Frank and Friendly- A Unique Photographic Memoir of a Legend. Evans Mitchell, 2007. ISBN 978-1901268324
- Eltonography: Sir Elton John a Life in Pictures. Evans Mitchell, 2008. ISBN 978-1901268331
- All About Bond. Evans Mitchell, 2012. ISBN 978-1901268577
- Terry O'Neill, 2013. ISBN 978-1851496921
- Terry O'Neill's Rock 'n' Roll Album. ACC, 2014. ISBN 978-1851497720
- Two Days That Rocked the World: Elton John Live at Dodger Stadium. ACC, 2015. ISBN 978-1851498062
- Breaking Stones 1963–1965: A Band on the Brink of Superstardom. ACC, 2016. ISBN 978-1851498161
- Terry O'Neill: Every Picture Tells a Story. ACC, 2016. ISBN 978-1851498338
- When Ziggy Played The Marquee. ACC, 2017. ISBN 978-1851498666
- Led Zeppelin Live : 1975–1977. ACC, 2018. ISBN 978-1851498963
- Terry O'Neill: Rare & Unseen. ACC, 2018. ISBN 978-1851498918
- Bowie by O'Neill: The definitive collection with unseen images. Cassell, 2019. ISBN 978-1788401012
- Elton John by Terry O'Neill: The definitive portrait, with unseen images. Cassell, 2019. ISBN 978-1788401487
- Always Audrey: Six Iconic Photographers. One Legendary Star. ACC, 2019. ISBN 978-1788840323

== Honours and awards ==
- 2004: Honorary Fellowship of the Royal Photographic Society
- 2011: Royal Photographic Society's Centenary Medal
- 2019: Appointed Commander of the Order of the British Empire (CBE) in the 2019 Birthday Honours for services to photography

== Collections ==
- National Portrait Gallery, London: 80 prints (as of July 2022 )
