= Aerograph =

Aerograph may refer to:

- Aerograph, a manufacturer and brand name of airbrush
- Aerograph, a 1919 piece of artwork by Man Ray
