= Frederick Lawrence =

Frederick Lawrence may refer to:

- Frederick G. Lawrence, American philosopher and theologian
- Frederick Geoffrey Lawrence (1902–1967), British lawyer
- Frederick M. Lawrence (born 1955), American legal scholar and former president of Brandeis University
- Frederick N. Lawrence (1834–1916), American financier and president of the New York Stock Exchange
- Frederick Pethick-Lawrence, 1st Baron Pethick-Lawrence (1871–1961), British politician
- Frederick William Lawrence (1890–1974), Canadian/American airbrush painter
- Fred Lawrence (1887–1964), English billiards and snooker player

== See also ==
- Frederic C. Lawrence (1899–1989), suffragan bishop of the Diocese of Massachusetts
