= DeVilbiss =

DeVilbiss may refer to:

- DeVilbiss Automotive Refinishing
- DeVilbiss High School (Toledo, Ohio), American high school which existed 1931–1991, full name Thomas A. DeVilbiss High School

== People ==
- Lydia Allen DeVilbiss (1882–1964), American physician
