= Bran Symondson =

British artist (born 1971)

- Born: 1971 (age 53–54)
- Occupation: Photographer
- Known for: AK47 artwork
- Notable work: Lost Boys
- Awards: Amnesty International Media Award
- Website: Official website

Bran Symondson (born 1971) is a British sculptor artist and photographer known for works relating to the War in Afghanistan and taking items of violence such as the AK47 rifle and transforming them into art. His work has been featured in multiple exhibitions, including Hollywood Reloaded and AKA Peace. In 2011, he was awarded the Amnesty International Media Award for his photograph entitled Lost Boys, showing young Afghan boys holding guns with flowers and stickers.

== Life and career ==
According to his biography at Maddox, Symondson was born in 1971. In the 1990s he took up a photography career, but choose to join the British Army Special Forces Reserves in 2004. On deployment during the war in Afghanistan to Helmand province, Symondson elected to bring his personal Canon G9 camera even on operations taking images of landscapes, civilians, and the Afgan police who Symondson was helping to train.

On return from deployment Symondson left the British army and gained a commission from the Sunday Times to return re-shoot images of the Afghan people.

In 2011 Symondson's first solo exhibition, The Best View of Heaven is from Hell, was held at the Idea Generation Gallery, It featured photographs of the Afgan Police, their cultural idiosyncrasies, and included images of the way they decorated their AK47 rifles with roses and stickers. In particular his photograph entitled Lost Boys showing young Afghan boys holding guns with flowers and stickers was awarded the 2011 Amnesty International Media Award.

Symondson developed the theme of weapons transformed with peaceful art as depicted in the Lost Boys image as part of what became his AKA Peace project which concept turned out to be a turning point in his artistic career. The resultant show at the Institute of Contemporary Arts (ICA) from 25 to 30 September 2012 brought together over 20 artists including as Damien Hirst and Gavin Turk who each created their interpretation of decommissioned AK47; the works being auctioned post-exhibition with proceeds to Peace one day who had held a concert for Internal Peace Day on 21 September.

Symondson has had problems exporting his art, in 2016 a decommissioned AK47 assault rifle artwork was seized by customs in Texas en route to an exhibition in Houston. When a buyer from New Zealand brought Symondon's work Beat of a wing of butterflies on an AK47 for NZ$35,000 only for it to be delayed in transit for many months and the butterflies deteriorated on arrival, with Symondon having to fly to Wellington, New Zealand to repair the work.

Gayatri Rangachari Shah, reviewing the 2017 second edition of Bahrain's art fair "Art Bahrain Across Borders" for Vogue Magazine (India), noted Symondson's "eye-catching works" of de-commissioned AK47s's decorate with objects like butterflies" with causing "quite a buzz" at the Maddox Gallery.

In 2019, Symondson collaborated with world-renowned photographer Terry O'Neill in a project Hollywood-Reloaded in which they worked on a photographic venture which included Hollywood actors and actresses.

In an interview Terry O'Neill describes his experience with Symondson as

He's taken such time and consideration when creating his art. He has transformed my photographs into something entirely his own. It's been a thrill for me to work with a young artist such as Bran, to listen to his thoughts and process...

— Terry O'Neill

== Selected exhibitions ==
- 2011, The Best View of Heaven is from Hell at the Idea Generation Gallery, Symondson's first solo exhibition.
- 2012, AKA Peace, at the ICA London.
- 2017, 2nd Bahrain art fair, exhibiting at the Bahrain MAddox Gallery.
- 2019, Hollywood Re-Loaded, A collaboration with Terry O'Neill.
- 2021, The Art to Disarm, at the House of Fine Art.
