= Airbrush Action Magazine =

Magazine in United States

Airbrush Action Magazine, established in 1985, is edited for all airbrush applications, including automotive custom painting, pin-up art, T-shirt airbrushing, illustration, fine art, hobby/craft applications, decorative arts, body art, and many others. The magazine is published on a bimonthly basis and has its headquarters in Lakewood, New Jersey. It annually hosts the Vargas Awards, named after Alberto Vargas, a pioneer of airbrush art.

The longest running airbrush publication in history (28 years), Airbrush Action has featured World-class artists, including Don Eddy, Jesse James (customizer), Ed Roth, Robert Williams, Alex Ross, George Barris (auto customizer), Charles White III, Thomas Blackshear, Mark Fredrickson, Chuck Close, Jerry Ott, H.R. Giger, Terry Hill, Frank Frazetta, Dru Blair, Hajime Sorayama, Drew Struzan, and dozens of others. Celebrity artists Hugh Hefner, Billy Dee Williams and Martin Mull, have also been showcased.

Airbrush Action has produced over 100 instructional DVDs on airbrush and other subjects, and published 10 books on airbrushing, pinstriping, and general art. Airbrush Action is distributed through most Barnes & Noble stores, 7-11, Books A Million, all branches of the military, and many other mainstream outlets, and is also available in digital versions, with the Airbrush Action application being available for free download. Airbrushaction.com features an airbrushing blog covering the latest airbrushing news, tips & tricks, user forums, streaming video, easy navigation, an online store, artist bios and galleries, top pro airbrush tricks and techniques, back issues, new products, buyers guides, late-breaking news, and much more. Airbrush Action offers three annual airbrushing getaways, hosted in Las Vegas and Orlando, with classes taught by world-renowned airbrush artists and all equipment provided. The classes are divided into multiple genres including airbrush mastery, automotive graphics, murals on steel, pinstriping and lettering, T-shirt airbrushing, and photorealism amongst many others. One- and four-day classes are offered with class sizes ranging from 20-30 people.
