= Paasche Airbrush Company =

The Paasche Airbrush Company is currently based in Kenosha, WI. The company manufactures airbrushes, industrial spray guns, air compressors and related equipment. Paasche has been a manufacturer of airbrushes for over 115 years, based on patented designs.

== History ==
Jens Andreas Paasche founded the company in 1904, and it was incorporated in 1916. Its first factory was built in Chicago in 1922. In 1984 the company moved to nearby Harwood Heights to obtain additional space, and in 2005 it moved back to Chicago. Most recently in 2018 they moved to Kenosha WI.
