= Alberto Vargas =

Peruvian-American painter (1896–1982)

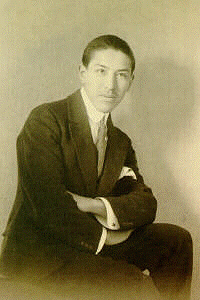
- Vargas in New York, c. 1919
- Born: Joaquin Alberto Vargas y Chávez; 9 February 1896; Arequipa, Peru
- Died: 30 December 1982 (aged 86); Los Angeles, California, U.S.
- Known for: Painter
- Notable work: Vargas Girls

Joaquin Alberto Vargas y Chávez (9 February 1896 – 30 December 1982) was a Peruvian-American painter of pin-up girls. These pin-ups are sometimes known as Vargas girls. He is often considered one of the most famous pin-up artists and a pioneer of airbrush art. Numerous Vargas paintings have sold, and continue to sell, for tens of thousands of dollars worldwide.

== Life and career ==
Born in Arequipa, Peru, on 9 February 1896, he was the son of noted Peruvian photographer Max T. Vargas. Alberto Vargas moved to the United States in 1916 after studying art in Europe, particularly in Zurich and Geneva, prior to World War I. While in Europe, he came across the French magazine La Vie Parisienne, with a cover by Raphael Kirchner, which he said greatly influenced his work.

His early career in New York included work as an artist for the Ziegfeld Follies and for many Hollywood studios. Ziegfeld hung his painting of Olive Thomas at the theater, and she was considered one of the earliest Vargas Girls. Vargas's most famous film poster was for the 1933 film The Sin of Nora Moran, which portrays a near-naked Zita Johann in a pose of desperation, bearing little resemblance to the real actress. The poster is frequently named one of the greatest movie posters ever made.

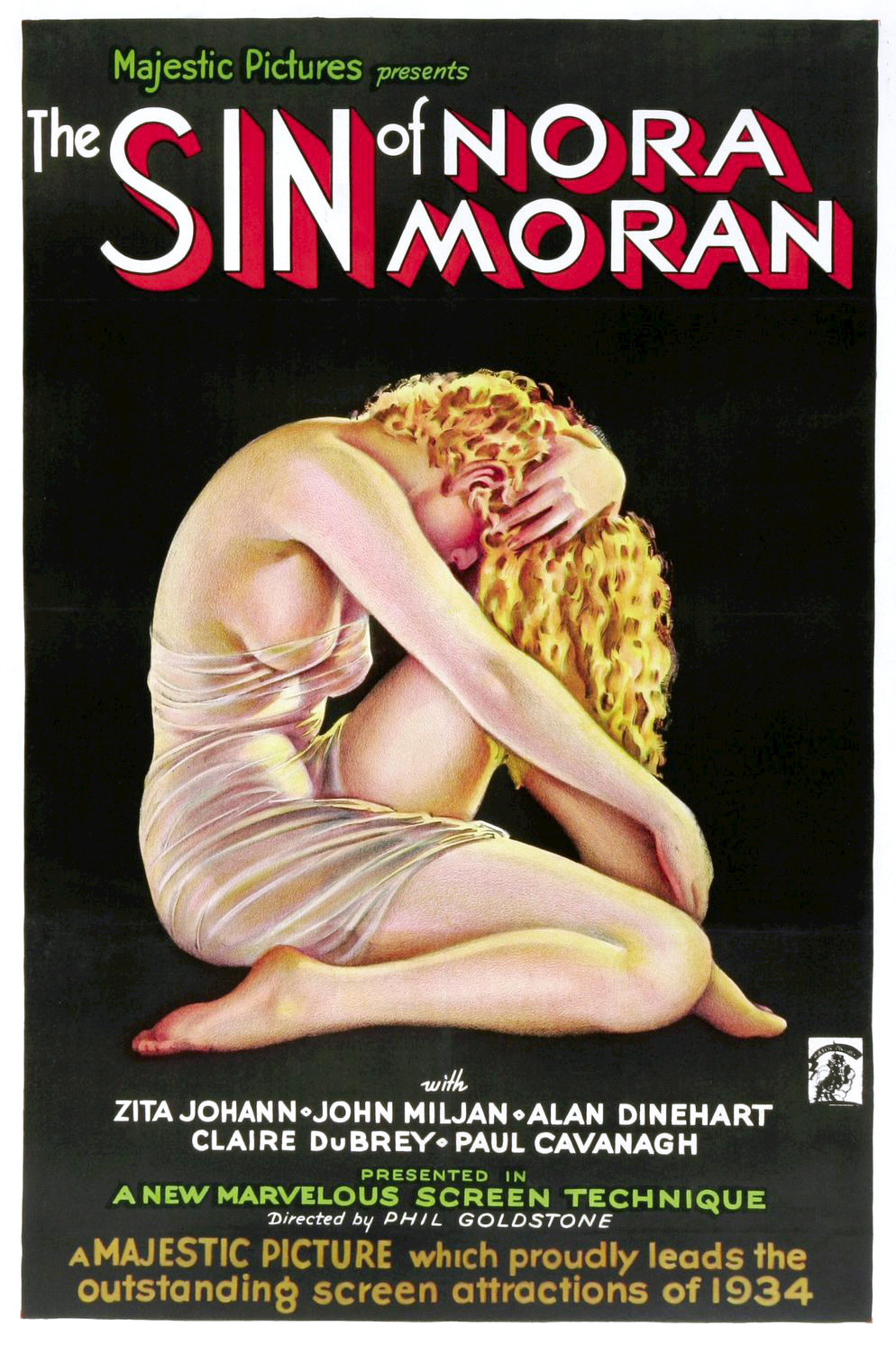
Vargas's 1933 theatrical release poster featuring actress Zita Johann

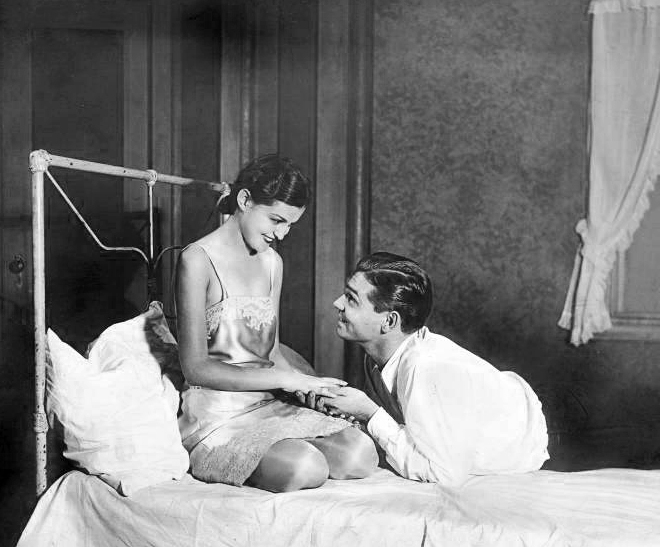
Photo of Zita Johann in the 1928 play Machinal for comparison

Vargas became famous in the 1940s as the creator of iconic World War II-era pin-ups for Esquire known as "Vargas Girls". Between 1940 and 1946, Vargas produced 180 paintings for the magazine. The nose art of many American and Allied World War II aircraft was inspired and adapted from these Esquire pin-ups, as well as those of George Petty and other artists.

In 2004 Hugh Hefner, the founder and editor-in-chief of Playboy who had previously worked for Esquire, wrote:

"The U.S. Post Office attempted to put Esquire out of business in the 1940s by taking away its second-class mailing permit. The Feds objected most of all to the cartoons and the pin-up art of Alberto Vargas. Esquire prevailed in the case that went to the Supreme Court, but the magazine dropped the cartoons just to be on the safe side."

A legal dispute with Esquire over the use of the name "Varga" resulted in a judgment against Vargas. He struggled financially until 1959, when Playboy began using his work. Over the next 16 years, he produced 152 paintings for the magazine. His career flourished, and he had major exhibitions of his work all over the world.

Vargas's artwork, paintings, and color drawings were periodically featured in issues of Playboy in the 1960s and 1970s.

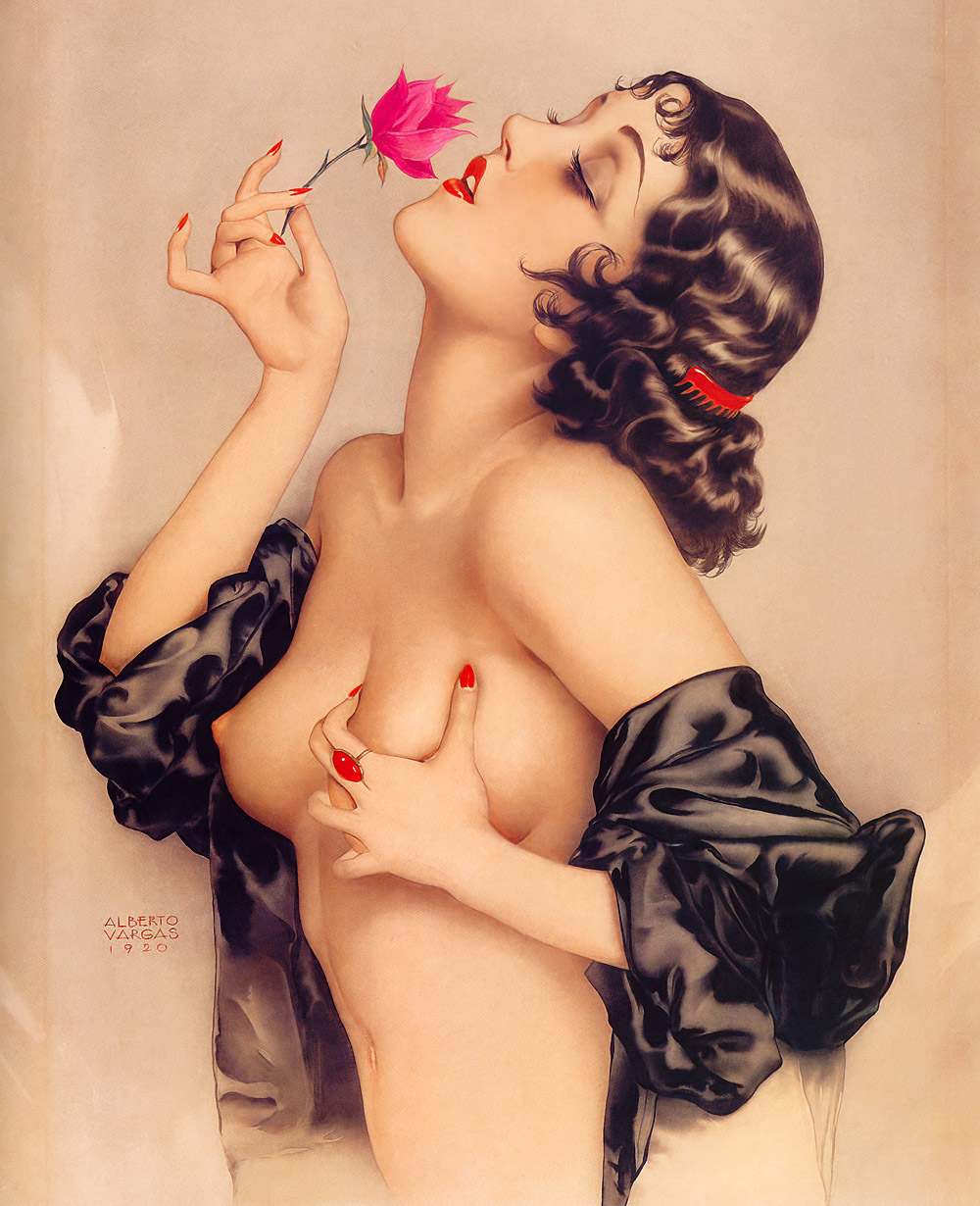
Memories of Olive portrays actress Olive Thomas (1920)

The death of his wife Anna Mae in 1974 left him devastated, and he stopped painting. Anna Mae had been his model and business manager, his muse in every way. The publication of his autobiography in 1978 renewed interest in his work and brought him partially out of his self-imposed retirement to do a few works, such as album covers for The Cars (Candy-O, 1979) and Bernadette Peters (Bernadette Peters, 1980; Now Playing, 1981). He died of a stroke on 30 December 1982 at the age of 86.

Many of Vargas's works from his period with Esquire are now held by the Spencer Museum of Art at the University of Kansas. The museum received those works in 1980, along with a large body of other art from the magazine.

At the December 2003 Christie's auction of Playboy archives, the 1967 Vargas painting Trick or Treat sold for $71,600 (equivalent to $125,000 in 2025).

His work typically combined watercolor and airbrush. His mastery of the airbrush is acknowledged by the founding of the Vargas Award, given annually by Airbrush Action Magazine and named after him. Despite always using figure models, he often portrayed elegantly dressed, semi-nude to nude women of idealized proportions. Vargas's artistic traits would be slender fingers and toes, with nails often painted red.

Vargas is widely regarded as one of the finest artists in his genre. He also served as a judge for the Miss Universe beauty contest from 1956 to 1958.

Notable women painted by Vargas include Billie Burke, Ruth Etting, Paulette Goddard, Bessie Love, Irish McCalla, Marilyn Miller, Marilyn Monroe, Nita Naldi, Bernadette Peters, Olive Thomas, Mamie Van Doren, and Candy Moore from The Cars' Candy-O album.

== See also ==
- List of pin-up artists
- Olivia De Berardinis
- San Francisco Art Exchange
