= Detackifier =

A detackifier is a process chemical that is used for reducing tackiness of other substances. Spraying paint and paper making are processes where inputs may need to be detackified or "denatured".

== Spray painting ==
Spray painting with solvent-based or water-based paint creates paint overspray, a waste material that must be effectively neutralized, or "detackified", and collected for disposal. In order to assist in the removal of the oversprayed paint from the air and to provide efficient operation of the down-draft, water-washed paint spray booths utilize paint detackifying chemical agents. The detackification products are commonly introduced into the water that is recirculated in the paint spray booth system. The first purpose is to render the paint non tacky so it does not stick to the booth equipment and foul the paint system. The second purpose is to efficiently collect the paint solids that were sprayed into the system and remove them from the water for disposal.

Paint spray booths for vehicles are typically 100–300 feet in length and usually contain many robotic and manual spray zones. The temperature and humidity are rigorously controlled in these systems. As items are painted in these booths, a certain amount of paint does not contact the article being painted and forms a fine mist of paint in the air space surrounding the article. This paint must be removed from the air. To accomplish this, the contaminated air is pulled through the paint spray booth by exhaust fans. A curtain of circulating water is maintained across the path of the air in such a way that the air must pass through the water curtain to reach the exhaust fans. As the air passes through the water curtain, the paint mist is “scrubbed” from the air and carried to a sump basin (sludge pit), usually located below the paint spray booth. In this area, the paint particles are separated from the water so that the water may be recycled and the paint particles disposed of as paint sludge. The paint detackifiers commonly added to these systems are either melamine-formaldehyde based, based upon acrylic acid chemistry, or chitosan.

The word detackification in the context of spray painting has come to mean more than mere charge-neutralization. In fact, it now means the entire process, which includes both detackification and flocculation.

== Paper making ==
Detackifiers reduce the tackiness of pitch-like materials or stickies so that they have less tendency to form agglomerates or deposit onto papermaking equipment or create spots in the product. Pitch is the common term for hydrophobic wood resin material found in the pulp. Resin is a common organic component of wood found in all trees. In paper making, the most widely used detackifier is talc, anionic dispersants, ethoxylated surfactants, and cellulose based detackifiers. The chemical formula of pure talc is magnesium silicate Mg_{3}Si_{4}O_{10}(OH)_{2}. Talc is a soft mineral with a relatively water-hating surface. These two attributes, softness and hydrophobicity are easy to observe when one pinches some talcum powder and then releases it onto the surface of water in a sink. In addition to talc, there are a number of proprietary chemical products that also are marketed as detackifiers. The common feature of these chemicals is that they are weak polyelectrolytes (sometimes cationic), and they have a tendency to form a film at the surface of tacky or hydrophobic suspended matter.

Some of the key rules of thumb for talc are (a) disperse it well, (b) add it to those process streams that are giving the biggest problems, (c) add it early enough to the process with enough agitation, and (d) add enough. If too little talc is used, the talc is merely incorporated into deposits and agglomerates of tacky materials. It makes sense also to use an effective retention aid program in order to retain the talc (and any attached tacky materials), purging the problem from the wet-end system. Similar considerations apply to the use of organic detackifiers. In either case, the best place to start in dealing with deposit problems is chemical analysis. Several major papermaking research groups have equipment for lab-scale simulation of pitch and stickies problems.

== See also ==
- Fixation agent
