= Leigh Behnke =

American painter (born 1946)

- Born: 1946 (age 79–80); Hartford, Connecticut, United States
- Education: New York University, Pratt Institute
- Known for: Painting
- Spouse: Don Eddy
- Awards: Guggenheim Fellowship, E.D. Foundation
- Website: Leigh Behnke

Leigh Behnke, The Paradox of Infinite Regression, oil on wood panel, 12" x 34", 1999.

Leigh Behnke (born 1946) is an American painter based in Manhattan in New York City, who is known for multi-panel, representational paintings that investigate perception, experience and interpretation. She gained recognition in the 1980s, during an era of renewed interest in imagery and Contemporary Realism.

Her paintings combine meticulous, realist technique, formal rigor commonly associated with abstraction, and postmodern conceptual strategies, such as fragmentation and deconstruction. Behnke's art has been exhibited by the Whitney Museum of American Art downtown branch, National Academy of Sciences and National Academy of Design Museum; she has been Included in major exhibitions on American Realism and watercolor at the Duke University Museum of Art and Neuberger Museum of Art, and major traveling shows, such as "Real, Really Real, Super Real" (1980–1, San Antonio Museum of Art), "American Realism: 20th Century Drawings and Watercolors" (1985–7, San Francisco Museum of Art), and "New York Realism—Past and Present" (1994–5, Kagoshima City Museum of Art; Tampa Museum of Art).

Her work belongs to the public art collections of the New York Public Library, New York Historical Society, and Nelson-Atkins Museum of Art, among others, and has been discussed in Artforum, Arts Magazine, ARTnews, The New York Times, and The Washington Post. Artforum critic Ronny Cohen described her work as a "sophisticated assault on the conventions of seeing underlying pictorial illusionism"; writing about her cityscapes, John Yau called Behnke "an archaeologist of light, a stark factualist." In 2013, she was recognized with a Guggenheim Fellowship; a monograph about her work, Leigh Behnke: Real Spaces, Imagined Lives, was published in 2005. Behnke teaches at the School of Visual Arts in New York City and is married to the photorealist painter Don Eddy.

== Early life and career ==
Behnke was born in Hartford, Connecticut in 1946. She initially studied interior design at the Pratt Institute (BFA, 1969), developing an interest in architecture, but switched to art, producing abstract sculpture that reflected the dominant influence of Minimalism and Constructivism. During her graduate studies at New York University (MFA, 1976), she explored geometric sculpture and painting that was influenced by Hans Hofmann; a back injury prompted her permanent shift to painting. Like many Photorealist artists (e.g., Chuck Close, Ralph Goings), Behnke turned from abstraction to representation, seeking a greater connection to experience and a more accessible style; nonetheless, she retained Abstract Expressionism's formal emphasis and concern for the artwork as physical object. In 1976, she began producing multi-panel paintings investigating sequentiality, perception and temporality, which bore the influence of Monet's color and light studies and of conceptual photographers, such as Hilla Becher, Hanne Darboven and Jan Dibbets. Art historian Virginia Anne Bonito wrote that in this work Behnke sought to create representational versions of Josef Albers's abstract, chromatic investigations (the "Square" paintings), colorist analogues to Muybridge's stop-action photography, and deconstructions of Cubism.

Behnke rented her first New York studio in 1972, sharing a Christopher Street space with painters John Wesley and Robert Birmelin; soon after, she met future husband, Don Eddy. After completing graduate studies, she exhibited actively, in group shows at the Phoenix Art Museum, Barbara Gladstone Gallery, Institute for Contemporary Art, Richmond, and Whitney Museum, among others, and the first of eleven solo exhibitions at Fischbach Gallery (1978), known for representing artists Eva Hesse, Jo Baer, Jane Freilicher and Alex Katz. In 1979, she began teaching at the School of Visual Arts in New York City; she has taught there for four decades.

Leigh Behnke, Light Study with Venetian Blinds, oil on wood panel, 15" x 82", 1981. Collection of Brown and Wood. Destroyed September 11, 2001 in World in Trade Center.

== Work and reception ==
Behnke emerged in the late-1970s amid resurgent interest in Contemporary Realism and changing norms regarding the relationships between representation and abstraction, referentiality and content. Art historians note that despite changing subject matter, the basic premises of her art have remained remarkably consistent: unpopulated, realist, multi-panel works that explore formal and conceptual issues involving perception, experience, the articulation of space, and the underlying mechanisms of the world. John Arthur compared her associative strategy to montage in film editing, which juxtaposes scenes to create new, unique meanings; curator Christopher Young correlates her method to Ferdinand Saussure's semiotic theories of language and signs. Leda Cempellin relates Behnke's approach to Renaissance narrative devices, the Cubist investigation of reality through fragmentation, and scientific method, which approaches phenomena from multiple perspectives. She and others suggest this approach creates several dichotomies in the work: representational realism and formalist abstraction, order and chaos, classical illusionism and postmodern fragmentation, city and nature, interior and exterior, celestial and terrestrial.

=== Early work: 1976–1980 ===
Behnke's early paintings were formally focused and consisted of multi-paneled, meticulously rendered conceptual watercolors based on her photographs of interiors, still lifes, cityscapes or architecture. This work examined the effects of carefully manipulated variations in light, perspective and arrangement on color, form, and composition, while also pushing value ranges and color intensity to rare extremes (for watercolor) through dozens of glaze layers, often requiring a month's time in total. Despite its realism, her investigations of color theory and "shadow dramas" of changing light (e.g., the "Time Sequence" and "Light and Intensity Variation" series) often drew comparisons, in formal terms, to the subtle value shifts and grids of Minimalist art.

Conceptually, Behnke's work of this time confronted the incompatibility between the sculpturally solid and dynamic natures of reality, reconciling change and stability, as well as art historical strategies for capturing experience (Renaissance, cubist and futurist). For example, the triptych Time Sequences/Value Changes (1979) investigates compositional and color effects as light and shadow exchange roles in a windowed interior; other works enact a similar strategies with exteriors, or still lifes (Three Spectral Pairs, 1978).

Leigh Behnke, Brooklyn Bridge Compositional Study (2nd Version), watercolor on paper, 53" x 40", 1983. Collection of Zurich Kemper Investments, Inc.

=== Interiors and cityscapes: 1980–1999 ===
By 1980, Behnke's work had evolved in three ways: she added oil paint to her repertoire, increasingly turned to New York City as a subject, and introduced a greater sense of temporality and unfolding, layered meaning through her use of the predella, a horizontal, multi-frame pictorial device of subsidiary, adjoined images often used on early-Renaissance religious altarpieces. Her oil paintings successfully adapted watercolor techniques—friskets and layered transparent glazes—that reviewers suggested endow the surfaces with a smooth, "mirror-like believability." In the four-sequence oil work Light Study with Venetian Blinds (1981), she examined shifting conditions of light, color, and view (as the blinds close); the interiors Geometric Configurations: Variations on A Square (1982) and East Hampton Staircase With Landscape (1986) explored compositional and formal possibilities in predella and triptych formats.

Behnke's cityscapes used these formats in a similar manner, bringing disparate viewpoints (bird's-eye, low-angle), dramatic changes in scale, and tightly cropped fragments into dialogue with one another; critics Grace Glueck and Gerrit Henry wrote that the composite works expressed "the dynamics of New York City life" and a "questioning aesthetic love." Works such as Brooklyn Bridge Compositional Study (2nd Version) (1983), Bridge Promenade (1991), Wallace's Heresy and Broken Symmetry (both 1990), often reduced buildings to geometric forms and colliding rhythms, generating visual tension through compressed, activated space. In her presentation of multiple perspectives, Behnke portrayed urban experience as visually complex—continuous, fragmented, dislocated, monumental and transient—and ambiguous in its effects: awe, pleasure, progress, disorientation, claustrophobia.

Leigh Behnke, Annie's View, oil on wood panel, 36" x 36", 2000. Collection of Sidley Austin Brown & Wood.

From the 1990s onward, iconography and narrative play an increasing role in Behnke's work, triggering senses of collective history, the past, and time in the dialogue between imagery; she has expanded its scope to include cosmological and natural phenomena, universal forms, and scientific theory. The images of her stacked, three-panel works, Sidereus Nuncius (1990), Interregnum (1995) and Blind Sight (1996), navigate and contrast varying rhythms, elements (land, water, air, light) and perspectives, progressing bottom to top from microcosm (fish, flowers, grass) to the human environment to macrocosm (the stars); such work often invokes scientific investigation and exploration: Sidereus Nuncius ("Starry Messenger") was an early astronomical book by Galileo Galilei, Wallace's Heresy references natural selection theorist Russel Wallace), and "blind sight" refers to pre-modern navigation methods. In the architectural triptychs, Archimedes's Dream (1998) and The Paradox of Infinite Regression (1999, above), Behnke explored complex, patterned spatial and geometric relationships and the mathematical form of the spiral or nautilus; critic Hilton Kramer called the latter work "a virtuosic pastiche of Futurism, Cubism and Realism executed with consummate skill."

Leigh Behnke, Aristotle's Fifth, oil on wood panel, 36" x 24", 2016.

=== Later work: 1999– ===
In 1999, Behnke received an E.D. Foundation grant to work on paintings based on Victorian homes, and chose to focus on Sagamore, Theodore Roosevelt's summer estate on Long Island. The resulting "Sagamore" series (1999–2000) used composite imagery, Behnke's own photographs, and information from several sources to project an imagined life onto historical people (domestic staff, the Roosevelts) and the space. Annie's View (2000) envisioned the house as seen and experienced by a servant, Annie, through four images unified visually by careful attention to the interplay of light and shadow and a strong sense of illusionism. Its primary upper panel depicts a corner of the top floor of a large house (where servants traditionally lived) as passers-by would see it; the lower three-scene predella reproduces, successively, the view from Annie's window, her room, and the back staircase, suggesting a fragmented reconstruction of her life there: a view of imagined freedom, the constraint of indoor employment, up-and-down labor. Other paintings in the series, such as Entrance for Edith and Alice and Sagamore: Downstairs, depict the home as seen from the Roosevelts' point of view.

In recent years, Behnke's imagery has become more varied, incorporating a wider range of elements (carousels, ornamental metalwork and statuary), locations and formats (single-image works) alongside her characteristic studies of architectural spaces and exteriors. Her 2009 exhibition, "Through the Looking Glass," focused on portals—passages, doors, arches, windows, stairwells—as vehicles for formal play and the evocation of imaginative and real dimensions and spaces; her work since then has often explored mythological iconography, as in Aristotle's Fifth (2016), which employs her tri-part, microcosm-to-macrocosm progression.

== Recognition ==
Behnke received a John S. Guggenheim Foundation Fellowship in 2013 and grants from the E.D. Foundation (1999, 2000). Her work belongs to many public and private art collections, including those of the New York Public Library, New York Historical Society, Butler Institute of American Art, Currier Gallery of Art, Georgetown University, Massachusetts Institute of Technology, Nelson-Atkins Museum of Art, and Springfield Art Museum in Missouri.
