= Predella =

Lower part of some altarpieces

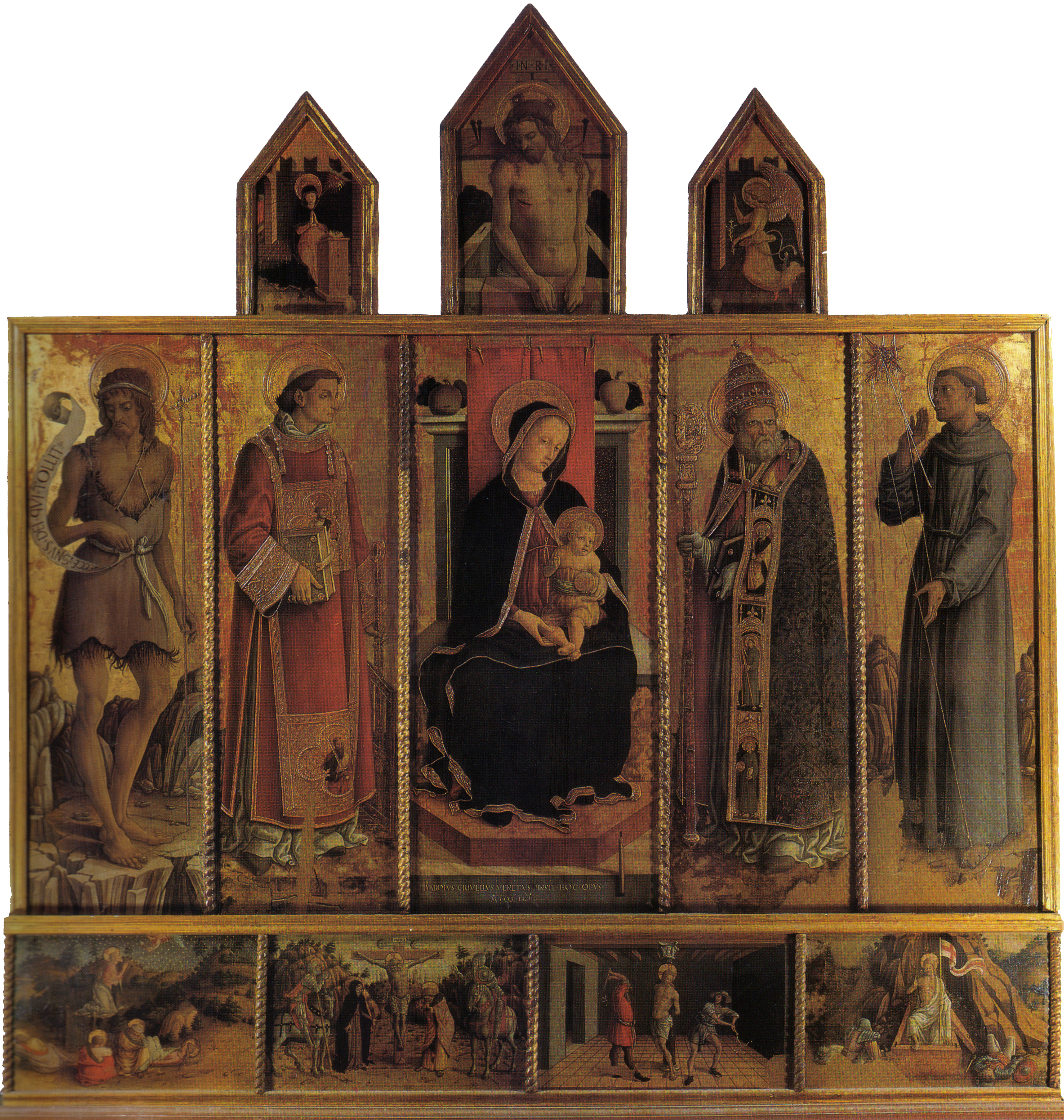
Altarpiece by Carlo Crivelli, 1468. The predella has four scenes from the Passion of Christ. The predella runs along the base, framed below

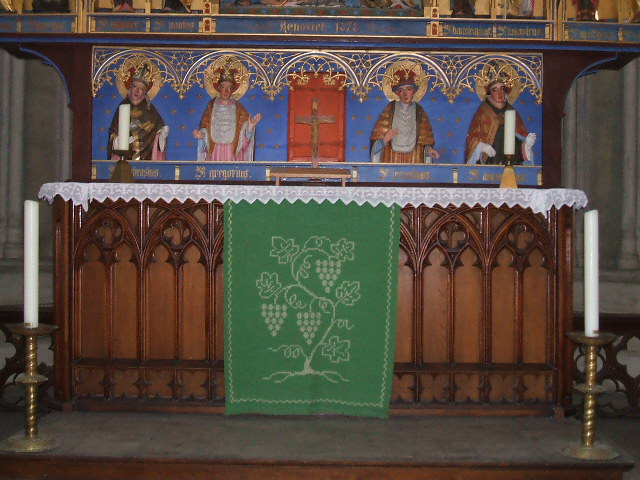
Altarpiece with carved and painted predella at Marienkirche Stralsund, Germany.

In art, a predella (plural predelle) is the lowest part of an altarpiece, sometimes forming a platform or step, and the painting or sculpture along it, at the bottom of an altarpiece, sometimes with a single much larger main scene above, but often (especially in earlier examples), a polyptych or multipanel altarpiece. In late medieval and Renaissance altarpieces, where the main panel consisted of a scene with large figures, it was normal to include a predella below with a number of small-scale narrative paintings depicting events from the life of the dedicatee, whether the Life of Christ, the Life of the Virgin or a saint. Typically there would be three to five small scenes, in a horizontal format. Sometimes a single space shows different scenes in continuous representation.

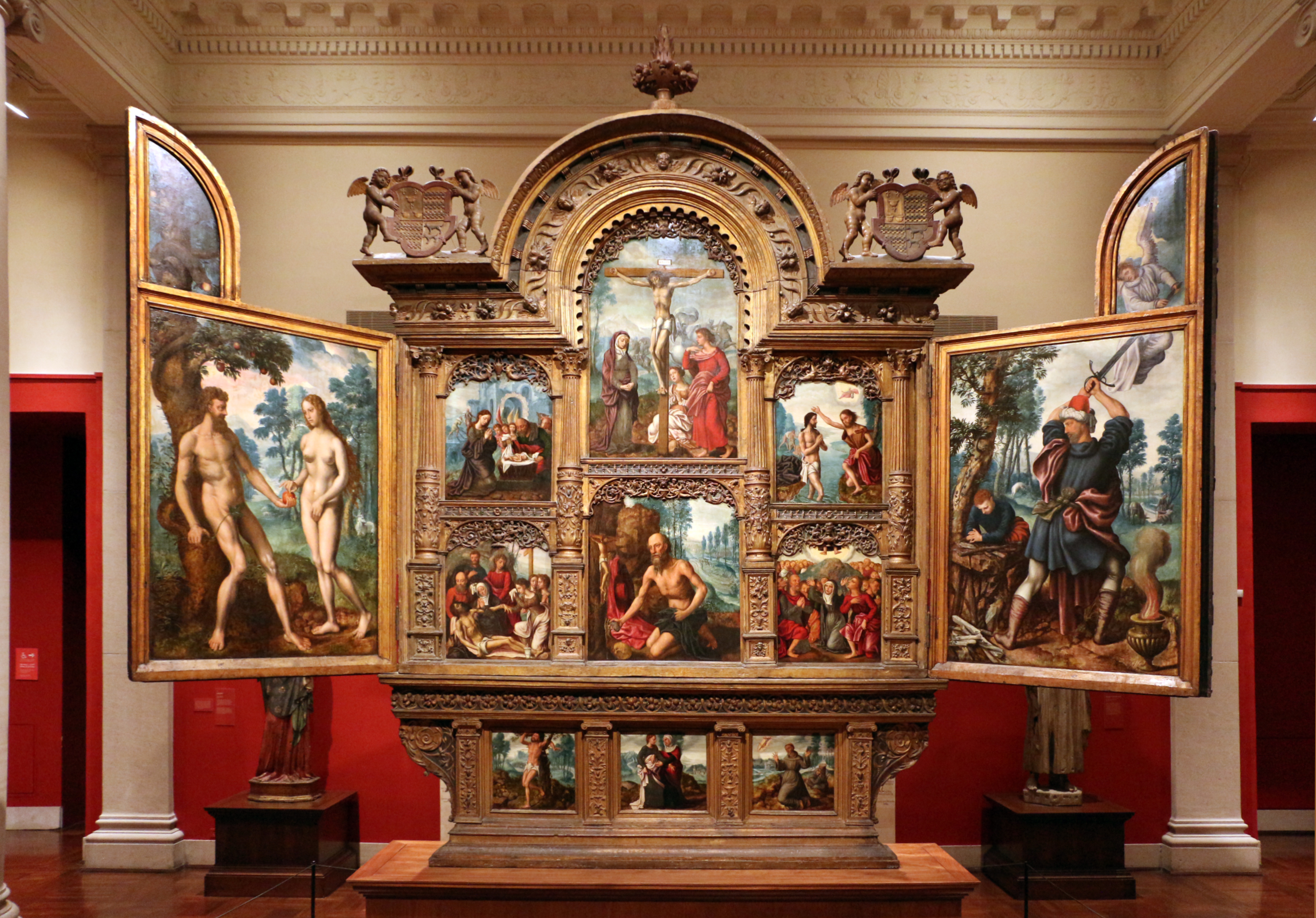
Flemish altarpiece of the 1550s, still with three predella scenes

They are significant in art history, as the artist had more freedom from iconographic conventions than in the main panel as they could only be seen from close up. As the main panels themselves became larger and more dramatic, predellas fell from use around 1510-20 in the High Renaissance, although older or more conservative painters continued to use them, for example Luca Signorelli, by then in his 70s, in about 1521. In this case he is thought to have only done the underdrawing for the main scene, leaving the painting to his workshop assistants. But he is thought to have painted the predella scenes himself.

They had fallen out of fashion in Italy by the mid 16th century, but continued for a while further north. As altarpieces reached the art market from the 18th century onwards, the predella scenes (and other smaller sections) were often detached and sold separately, in effect as cabinet paintings, and they are now often spread across several museum collections, with their origin often uncertain. Reuniting, at least conceptually, predella panels with the rest of their original settings gave 20th-century art historians a large task, which continues into the 21st century.

More generally, and not usually in the English language, a predella is an altar-step, a shelf above and behind an altar, or a piece of furniture with a lower part to kneel on, for prayer, and often a higher part to support the arms. In English the French term prie-dieu is normally used for this. Predel or pretel, was Langobardic for "a low wooden platform that serves as a basis in a piece of furniture". In English this step is referred to as a gradin, which may include a predella in it. A predella is also the lower part of a stained-glass window.

Similar small reliefs are sometimes placed under a larger piece of sculpture. Donatello placed a narrow scene of Saint George Freeing the Princess on the base of his Saint George for Orsanmichele.

== Examples ==
Examples of predellas include:

- Duccio – the predella of his Maestà – one of the earliest predellas.
- Lorenzo Monaco – Incidents in the Life of Saint Benedict (c. 1407–1409)
- Luca Signorelli – The Adoration of the Shepherds (c. 1496)
- Andrea Mantegna – San Zeno Altarpiece (1459)
- Stanley Spencer – Sandham Memorial Chapel, Burghclere, Hants.
- Pre-Raphaelite Dante Rossetti revisited the predella in his second Beata Beatrix (1871-1872).
- Leigh Behnke – a 20th-century realist, she has made use of the predella format in numerous works (c. 1981–2019)
