= DeVilbiss Automotive Refinishing =

Maker of spray painting equipment based in Ohio, USA

DeVilbiss Automotive Refinishing is an American manufacturer of spray guns, airbrushes, and related products for paint and lacquer coating applications. The company was founded in 1907 and is based in Scottsdale, Arizona, US.

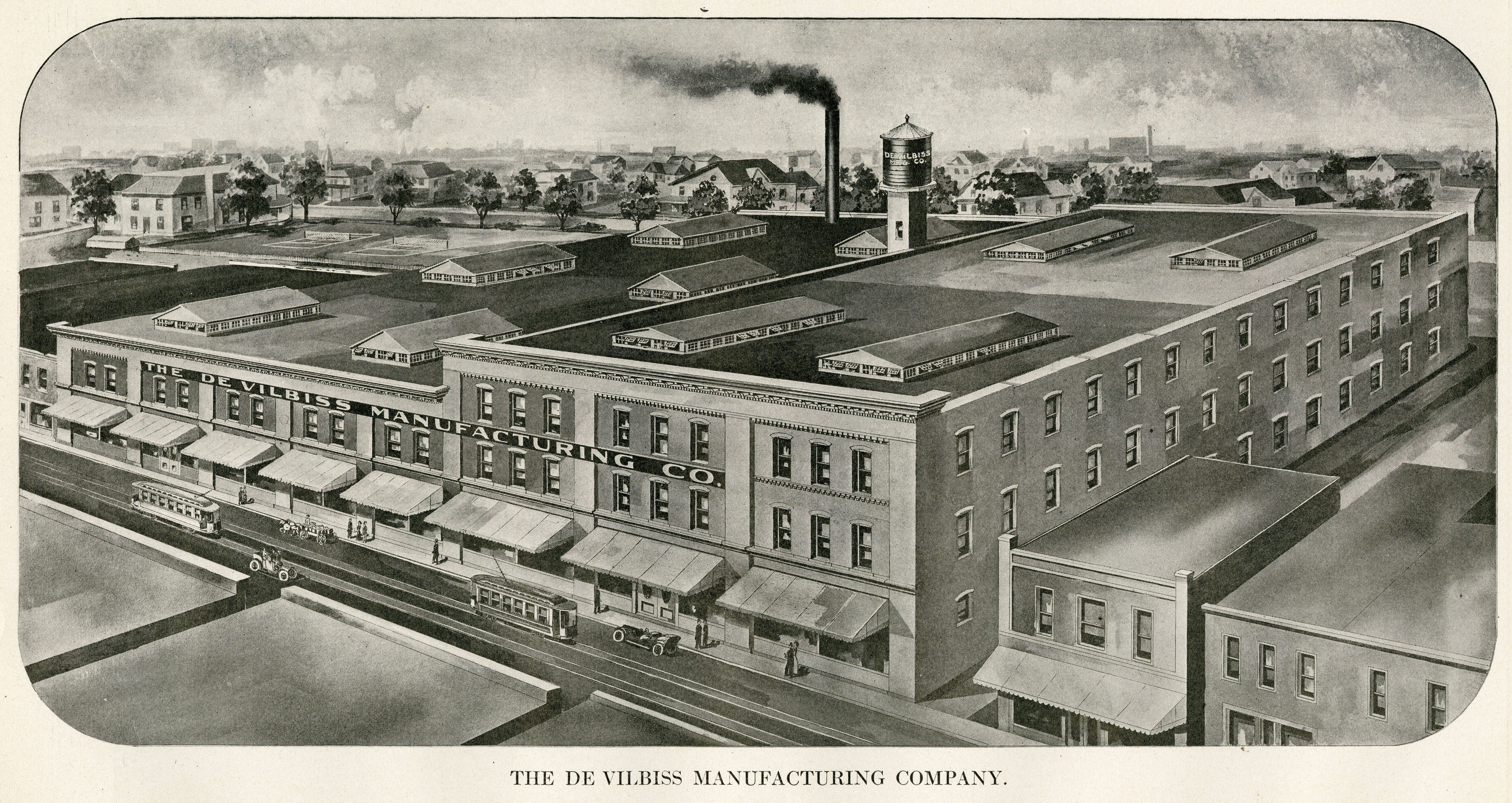
DeVilbiss Manufacturing Plant, 1912

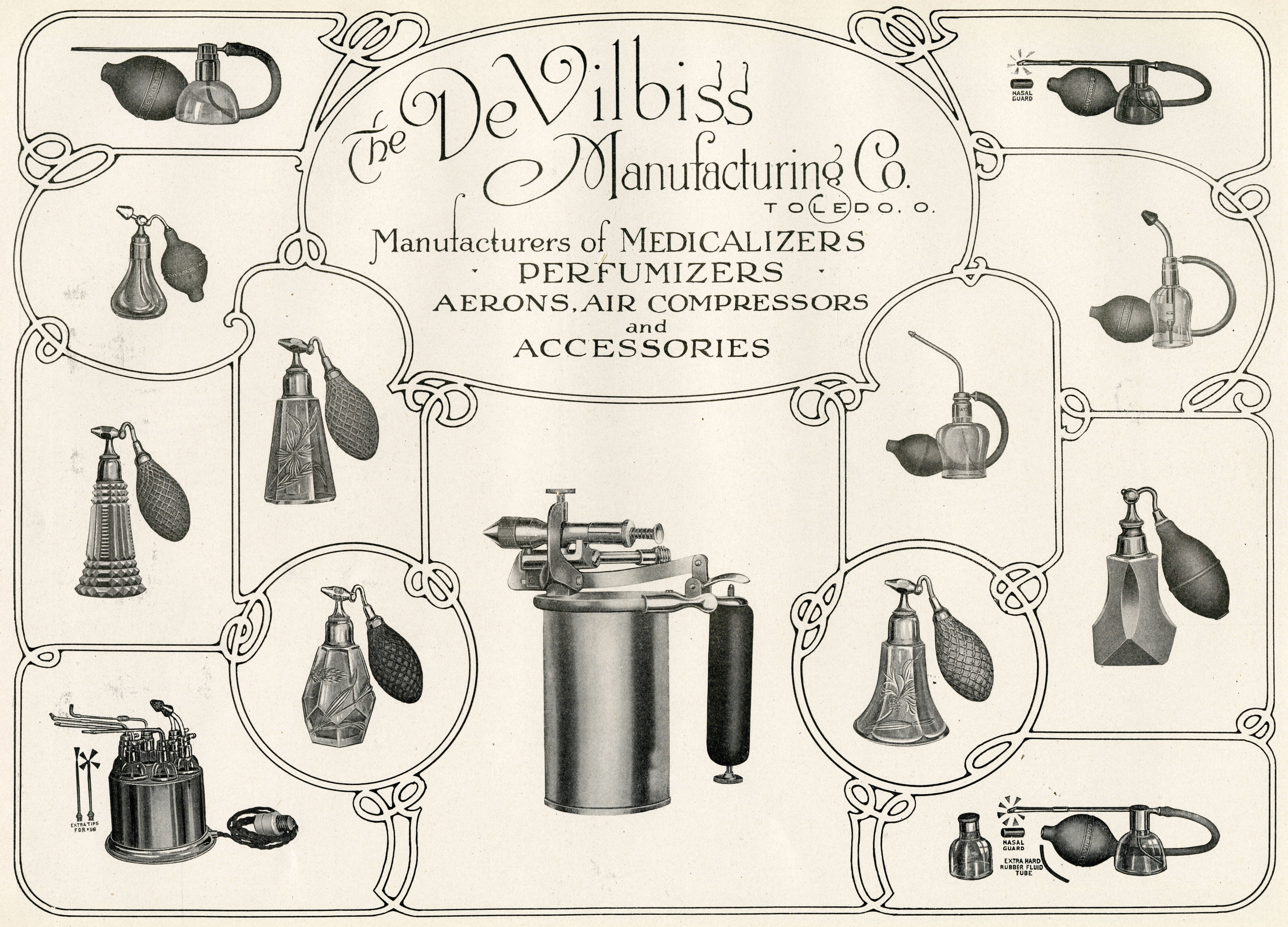
DeVilbiss Manufacturing Products, 1912
