= Overspray =

Overspray refers to the application of any form of paint, varnish, stain or other non-water-soluble airborne particulate material onto an unintended location. This concept is most commonly encountered in graffiti, auto detailing, and when commercial paint jobs drift onto unintended objects.

== Auto detailing and drifting paint ==
Overspray is considered undesirable in auto detailing when drifting paint lands on vehicles. Some companies specialize in overspray removal and car protection, producing solvents, razor blades, and rubbing compounds. The most common removal method is using a clay bar, made by manufacturers such as Meguiar's, 3M, Clay Magic, and Mothers. An estimated 200,000 cars are affected by overspray each year in the United States.

== Overspray prevention ==
Various measures are employed to prevent overspray from damaging property and emitting airborne toxins: applying paint with rollers versus spray painting, dry fall coating, containment systems and the implementation of wind monitoring programs by painting contractors.
