= Don Eddy =

American painter

- Born: November 4, 1944; Long Beach, California
- Education: University of Hawaiʻi, University of California, Santa Barbara
- Known for: Painting
- Spouse: Leigh Behnke
- Website: Don Eddy

Don Eddy, New Shoes for H, acrylic on canvas, 44" x 48", 1973. Cleveland Museum of Art collection.

Don Eddy (born 1944) is a contemporary representational painter. He gained recognition in American art around 1970 amid a group of artists that critics and dealers identified as Photorealists or Hyperrealists, based on their work's high degree of verisimilitude and use of photography as a resource material. Critics such as Donald Kuspit (as well as Eddy himself) have resisted such labels as superficially focused on obvious aspects of his painting while ignoring its specific sociological and conceptual bases, dialectical relationship to abstraction, and metaphysical investigations into perception and being; Kuspit wrote: "Eddy is a kind of an alchemist … [his] art transmutes the profane into the sacred—transcendentalizes the base things of everyday reality so that they seem like sacred mysteries." Eddy has worked in cycles, which treat various imagery from different formal and conceptual viewpoints, moving from detailed, formal images of automobile sections and storefront window displays in the 1970s to perceptually challenging mash-ups of still lifes and figurative/landscapes scenes in the 1980s to mysterious multi-panel paintings in his latter career. He lives in New York City with his wife, painter Leigh Behnke.

== Early life and career ==
Eddy was born in Long Beach, California in 1944. In early adolescence, he worked at his father's auto body shop doing custom paint jobs, an experience that familiarized him with Southern California car culture, the airbrush as a painting tool, and working-class concern for craft—all factors in his later art. He studied art history and fine arts at the University of Hawaiʻi (BFA, 1967; MFA, 1969), also working as a snapshot photographer for a tourist agency. After exploring and rejecting the prevailing mode of abstract expressionist subjectivity, he was drawn to the more accessible work of Surrealist René Magritte and the commercialized realism of Pop artist James Rosenquist, both of which juxtaposed incongruous images in a single painting space.

After graduating, Eddy completed PhD coursework in art history at University of California, Santa Barbara while continuing to paint. By 1970, he had shifted from early mixed-media and figurative work and turned to car-culture imagery and the Paasche H airbrush from his youth (which he has used his entire career) in works focused on the nature of space in painting. He received his first widespread recognition through exhibitions such as "Sharp-Focus Realism" (Sidney Janis Gallery) and Documenta 5 (1972), "California Realist Painters" (Santa Barbara Museum of Art, 1973) and "Hyper-Realisme Americaine, Realism European" (Centre National d'Art Contemporain, 1974). After moving to New York City in the early 1970s, he continued to appear in prominent surveys at the Whitney Museum and San Antonio Museum of Art, among others, while establishing a longtime relationship with New York dealer Nancy Hoffman, whose gallery has put on his solo exhibitions from 1974 to 2020.

== Process ==
Eddy paints using a systematic, painstaking process he developed early in his career, exploiting what he calls his "obsessive-compulsive" temperament. He begins with multiple photographs recording a maximum of detailed visual information. After selecting a "master image", he projects it onto a canvas and maps out his composition. He then lays down three sequences of transparent underpainting in tiny (1/16") layered airbrush circles of different value: the first, in phthalocyanine green, supplies detailed image information and value structure; a burnt sienna layer distinguishes warm from cool regions and amplifies the darks; and a dioxazine purple layer further specifies the warms and cools. In the final stage, he airbrushes the full range of local colors in the same manner (often 15–25 layers), based on the chromatic structure of the underpainting rather than the actual objects photographed. He has described the result as a kind of illusion—small, abstract circles that resolve into highly representational images at a distance.

== Work and reception ==
Eddy's work has been informed by wide-ranging, sometimes contradictory influences: old masters (e.g., van Eyck and Vermeer), Impressionist and Neo-Impressionist color, the analytical cubism of Braque and Picasso, Hans Hofmann, Conceptual and Minimalist critiques of Abstract Expressionism, and Pop art. His art stakes out paradoxical positions to both realism and abstraction, investigated in the context of recognizable, accessible imagery. It rejects abstract art, yet like that work, emphasizes surface and pictorial issues over imagery according to writer William Dyckes: "[Eddy] is essentially a field painter … concerned with the interactions of shapes and colors rather than with the representation of specific imagery in space." Likewise, it seems to value photographic verisimilitude, yet in fact, exceeds the camera and human eye by heightening painting attributes such as optical brilliance, tactile highlighting and multiple perspectives.

Don Eddy, C/V/II E: Dreamreader, acrylic on canvas, 1984

=== Early painting cycles (1970–1989) ===
In the early 1970s, Eddy painted several largely formal cycles involving automobiles. The first captured the reflective possibilities of chrome and high-gloss paint in large, deadpan, highly detailed images of tightly framed bumpers, headlights, grills, wheel hubs and car bodies, which critics suggest transformed ordinary things into animate, uncanny presences and objects of contemplation beyond function (e.g., Bumper Section XIII or Ford—H & W, both 1970). According to critic Amei Wallach "they juxtapose an exuberant baroque abstraction with a modernist geometry that suggests the hyperpurity of Charles Sheeler and the American precisionists." In the "Private Parking" series (1971), Eddy depicted cars seen through chain-link fences hung with signage, using the crisscrossing patterns and abstract shapes to intensify contradictions between illusionism and the single-plane picture surface.

In subsequent cycles, Eddy dissolved the corporeality and decipherability of his images by focusing on windows—initially car showrooms (the "Showroom" works, 1971–2), and later, kitchenware and shoe storefronts yielding more chaotic compositions (e.g., Pots and Pans, 1972; New Shoes for H., 1973). The window surfaces—both transparent and reflective—enabled him to focus simultaneously on two planes, something impossible in normal vision. The clash of recognizable forms, hard-edged shapes, light and cityscape resulted in what art historian Alvin Martin called "highly veristic adaptations of Cubist theory." Eddy pushed this dissolution to a maximum in late-1970s paintings depicting silverware (and later, crystal) displays on stacked glass and mirrored shelves, which he set up in his studio to explore light refraction. Critics described that cycle—stripped to an austere palette of icy blues and silvers—as inducing a "perceptual overload" where dazzling optical play and complexity reduced space and imagery to nearly unrecognizable abstract patterns (e.g., Silverware V for S, 1977; G-I, 1978).

In the 1980s, Eddy decided that this work was too cerebral. He reintroduced color and a Pop dimension—in the form of quickly chosen, inexpensive toys, gumballs, and Disney characters recognized from his youth—in the "Dime Store" cycles. These paintings inaugurated dramatic evolutions in style and imagery, including a conceptual shift from perceptual issues to more profound questions regarding thought and the nature of experience. He turned from fully painted still lifes to compositions in which he intuitively selected and painted only what he deemed most compelling, yielding imagery that hovered, apparently weightless, over black voids suggesting memory or dream (e.g., C/VI/B (Mickey in a Half Moon Midnight), 1982). With the subsequent '"C/VII", "Daydreamer" and "Dreamreader" series, Eddy introduced more jarring juxtapositions of time, place, space and mood, which floated dime-store items over vistas of places he visited (Paris, Italy, Hawaii), interiors, and figures (his daughter, old-master painting personages). These series, which mix man-made and natural, fantasy, reality and mystery, point toward his more spiritual later-career work.

Don Eddy, Oracle Bones, acrylic on canvas, 75" x 74", 1996.

=== Later painting (1989– ) ===
By the late 1980s, the everyday quality of Eddy's past work was overtaken by imagery that seemingly spanned the universe, from microscopic to cosmic: flora and fauna, landscape, figures, architecture and art history (e.g., The Clearing II, 1990; Oracle Bones, 1996). The new paintings explored the mystery of being through images of flowing water, rainbows, light and immaterial energy alluding to both timelessness and shifting conditions (e.g., Seasons of Light, 1998–9). Donald Kuspit characterizes his revival of the spiritual as a "mystical leap of faith" combining aspects of Christianity, Buddhism and Taoism in works that suggest modern-day icons.

Eddy employed a new multi-panel strategy to capture this quality: geometric polyptychs, grids (Catena Aureum, 1995), and most significantly, medieval altarpiece formats that were vehicles for poetic juxtapositions encouraging contemplation (e.g., Imminent Desire and Distant Longing II, 1993). He sought to overcome what he considered a weakness of single-canvas representational work—a reductive "fixing" of the richness and dynamism of experience. His multi-panel works employ images like textual signifiers; meaning does not reside "in" the image (as with symbols), but rather, is generated between and amongst images in relation (e.g., Krishna's Gate, 1995; The Dante Paradox, 2000). Writers note the work's open-ended, democratic character, in which meaning relies on the specific experiences observers bring into active interaction with each painting.

In his exhibition at the Museu Europeu d'Art Modern (Barcelona, 2014), Eddy presented eight largely rectangular triptychs created between 2005 and 2011 that combined natural, architectural, and gradually, urban imagery (e.g., Nostos I, 2005; Mono No Aware II, 2011). In subsequent work, he has continued to explore natural and ephemeral imagery (e.g., the "I Am Water II" works, 2019–20), but has more often focused on urban images of evening skylines, traffic and cafes, elevated trains, bridges and interiors (e.g., Sleepless in Paris, 2017; the "Metal City" works, 2016–20).

== Collections ==
Eddy's work belongs to many museum collections, including the Metropolitan Museum of Art, Museum of Modern Art, Solomon R. Guggenheim Museum and Whitney Museum in New York, the Bogotá Museum of Modern Art, Cleveland Museum of Art, The Contemporary Museum, Honolulu, Israel Museum, Musée d'art moderne et contemporain (MAMC, France), Saint Louis Art Museum, San Antonio Museum of Art, and Utrecht Museum (The Netherlands).

== See also ==
- Photorealism
- Hyperrealism (visual arts)
