= San Francisco Art Exchange =

Art gallery in San Francisco, California, US

Coordinates: 37.787167°N 122.410896°W

San Francisco Art Exchange LLC is an art gallery in San Francisco, California, United States, founded in 1983.

The gallery first rose to prominence through its role in establishing the work of pinup artist Alberto Vargas as fine art. Less than a year after the San Francisco Art Exchange's 1985 display of 100 Vargas drawings, it announced the sale of two of his works for $550,000. Prior to the show, the highest price paid for a Vargas had been $80,000; In September 1986, the gallery announced the sale of 45 Vargas paintings for $4.6 million.

The gallery is also known for rock and roll art and photography. It debuted the painting of musician Ronnie Wood in 1987. In 2005 it displayed the photography of Pattie Boyd, known as the wife and muse (Layla) of musicians George Harrison and Eric Clapton.
