= Airbrush =

Small, air-operated tool that atomizes and sprays various media

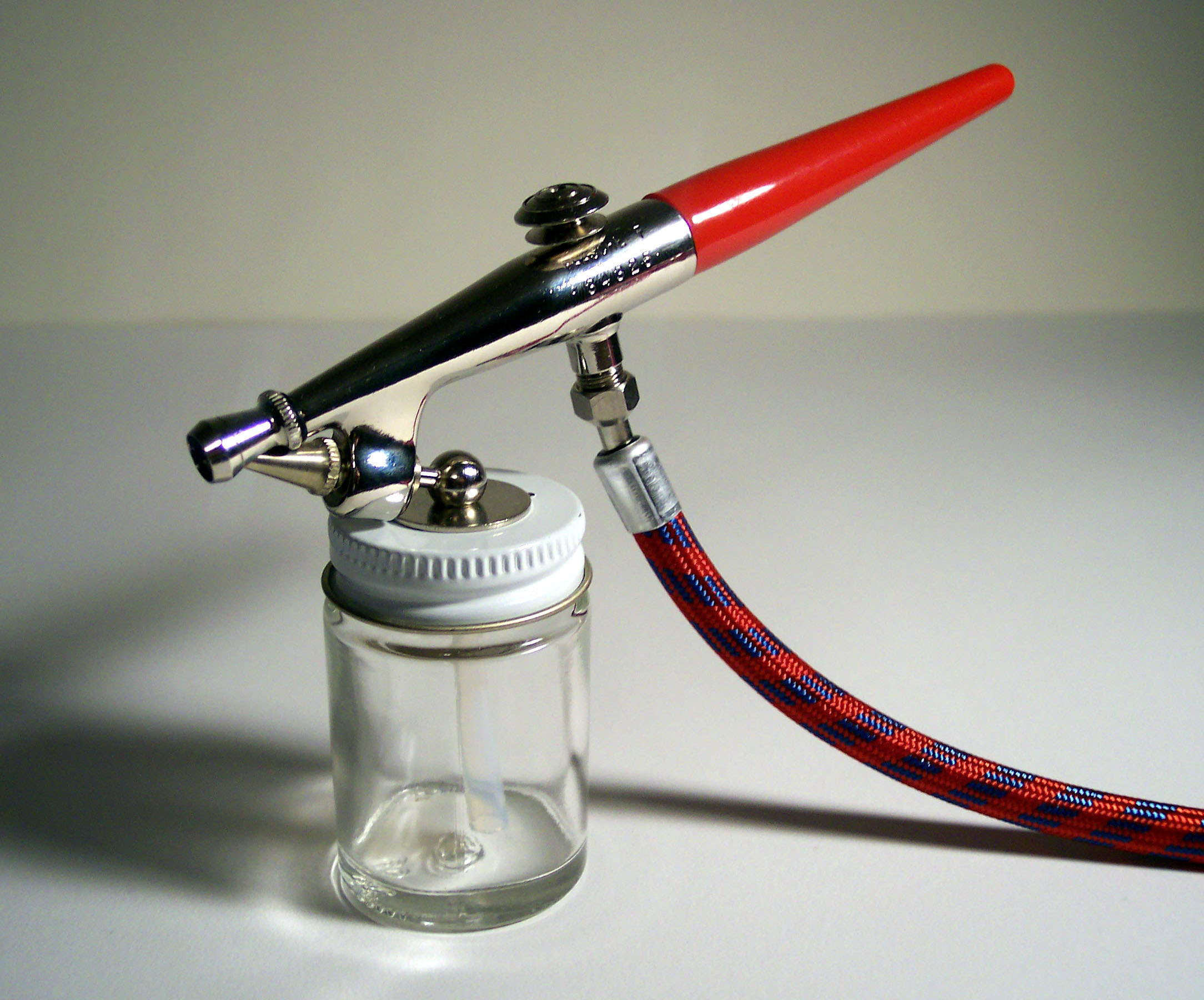
Paasche F#1 Single-action external mix airbrush

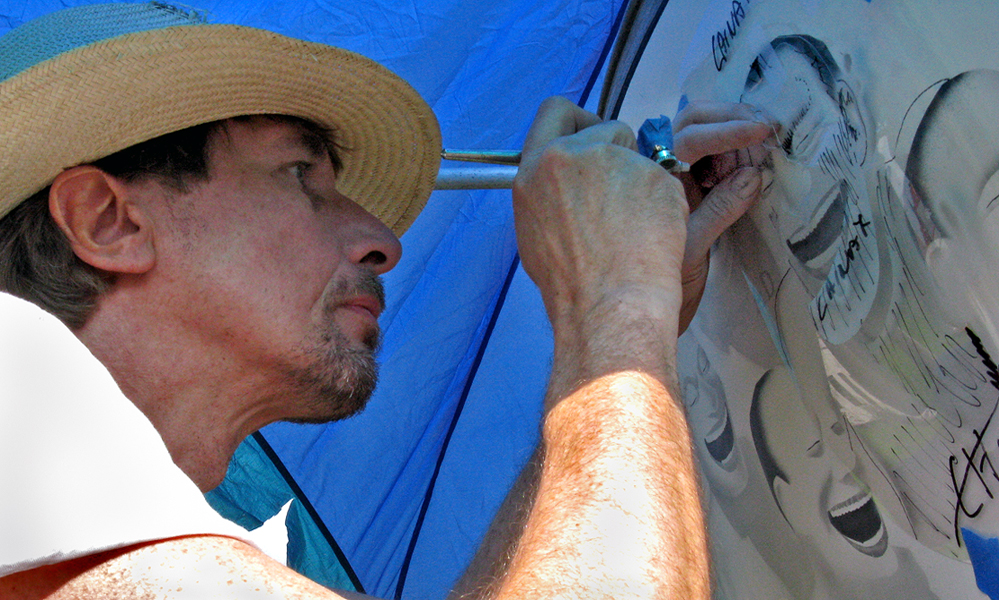
An Airbrush artist at work

An airbrush is a small, air-operated tool that atomizes and sprays various media, most often paint, but also ink, dye, and make-up. Spray painting developed from the airbrush and is considered to employ a type of airbrush.

== History ==
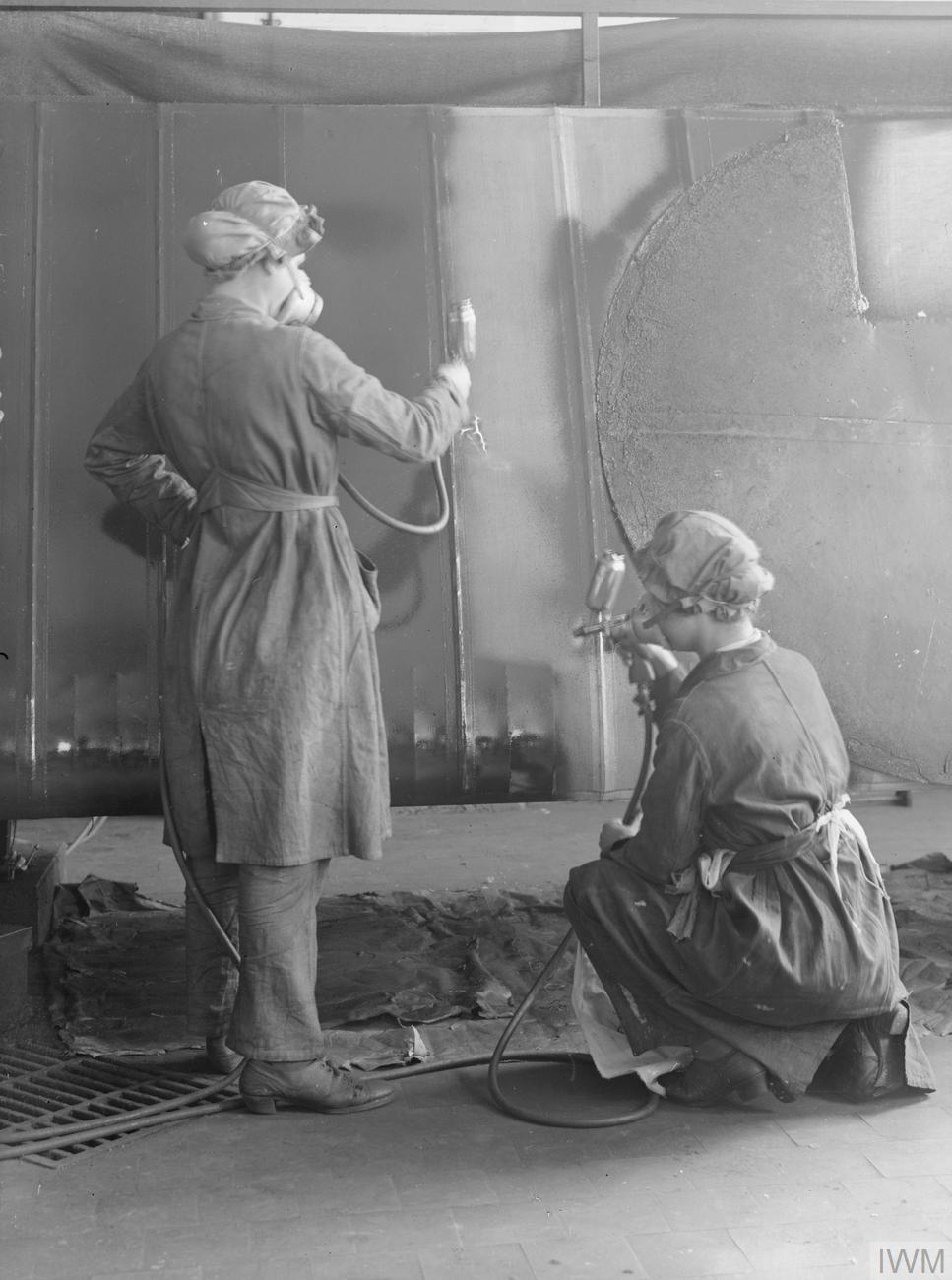
Two factory workers using airbrushes to paint an aircraft wing, September 1918

Up until the mid-2000s, it was widely published that the airbrush was invented in 1893, but following research undertaken in collaboration with New York University's Conservation Department, and personal support from Professor Margaret Holben Ellis, a more detailed history emerged, which required many authorities such as Oxford Art to update their dictionaries and references.

Depending on the definition requiring compressed air or not, the first spray painting device that could be called an airbrush was patented in 1876 (U.S. patent 182,389) by Francis Edgar Stanley of Newton, Massachusetts. This worked akin to a diffuser/atomizer and did not have a continuous air supply. Stanley and his twin brother later invented a process for continuously coating photographic plates (Stanley Dry Plate Company) but are perhaps best known for their Stanley Steamer. No artistic images that used this 'paint distributor/atomiser' exist or are as yet known.

According to the research prepared by Professor Andy Penaluna, the first instrument to use a compressed air supply named the "paint distributor" was developed by Abner Peeler "for the painting of watercolors and other artistic purposes" and used a hand-operated compressor to supply continuous air. It was rather crude, being based on a number of spare parts in a jeweller's workshop such as old screwdrivers and welding torches. It took four years of further development before a working prototype was developed by Liberty Walkup of Mt. Morris, Illinois. Walkup patented the work under the name of "air-brush", a name his wife Phoebe Walkup came up with. The birth of the name 'Air Brush' can be traced to a stakeholders' meeting of the new Air Brush Manufacturing Co. at 7:00 p.m. on October 6, 1883, when the name was formally born. In modern times the date is used to celebrate airbrush art around the world, using the Twitter hashtag #airbrushartistday. Walkup's wife would later go on to be the founder of the Illinois Art School where airbrushing was taught to students from all over the world. In that same rented 4-story building Rockford Air-Brush would be established under Liberty Walkup. Among others, the Walkups taught airbrush technique to American Impressionist master Wilson Irvine at the Air Brush School in Rockford, Illinois. The first certain 'atomizing' type airbrush was invented by Charles Burdick in 1893 and presented by Thayer and Chandler art materials company at the World Columbian Exposition in Chicago. Burdick founded the Fountain Brush Company in the US, and launched the first series of airbrushes onto the market. However, Burdick initially re-cased the Walkup design into a finger-operated instrument, and as many of his designs echoed those being developed by Walkup, a legal row resulted over the name Air Brush. This device was essentially the same as a modern airbrush, resembling a pen and working in a different manner than Peeler's device. Aerograph, Burdick's original company, still makes and sells airbrushes in England. Thayer and Chandler were acquired by Badger Air-Brush Co. in 2000. Badger Air-Brush continues the Thayer and Chandler tradition of manufacturing quality airbrush guns, tools and compressors out of Franklin Park, Illinois.

Jens Paasche, a Danish immigrant, patented in 1907 his turbine airbrush. It is an external mix airbrush, where the airstream is divided in two at the trigger mechanism: one part of the stream spins a turbine (some 20,000 rpm) and another stream comes out of the nozzle, being the actual paint stream. The turbine moves a camshaft, which moves a reciprocating needle, which moves through a paint trough, inserting microscopic droplets of paint in the nozzle air stream. This patent eventually became the legendary Paasche AB Turbo airbrush, which is famous for its capability of making lines as narrow as human hair. It is also well known to be extremely tedious to adjust. It was the preferred tool of many artists, such as Alberto Vargas

The Paasche AB Turbo is no longer manufactured (2026). It is a specialist tool, well known for its idiosyncrasies, but computerized image manipulation has occupied its ecological niche. Still, second-hand AB Turbos are sought after among hobbyists and collectors on Internet trading places.

== Design ==
An airbrush works by passing a stream of fast moving (compressed) air through a venturi, which creates a local reduction in air pressure (suction) that allows paint to be pulled from an interconnected reservoir at normal atmospheric pressure. The high velocity of the air atomizes the paint into very tiny droplets as it blows past a very fine paint-metering component. The paint is carried onto paper or other surfaces. The operator controls the amount of paint being blown by using a variable trigger which manipulates the position of a very fine tapered needle that is the control element of the paint-metering component. An extremely fine degree of atomization is what allows an artist to create such smooth blending effects using the airbrush.

The technique allows for the blending of two or more colors in a seamless way, with one color slowly becoming another color. Freehand airbrushed images, without the aid of stencils or friskets, have a floating quality, with softly defined edges between colors, and between foreground and background colors. A skilled airbrush artist can produce paintings of photographic realism or can simulate almost any painting medium. Painting at this skill level involves supplementary tools, such as masks and friskets, and very careful planning.

Some airbrushes use pressures as low as 20 psi (1.38 bar) while others use pressures in the region of 30-35 psi (2-2.4 bar). Larger "spray guns" as used for automobile spray-painting need 100 psi (6.8 bar) or more to adequately atomize a thicker paint using less solvent. They are capable of delivering a heavier coating more rapidly over a wide area. Even with small artist airbrushes using acrylic paint, artists must be careful not to breathe in the atomized paint, which floats in the air for minutes and can go deep into the lungs. With commercial spray guns for automobiles, it is vital that the painter have a clean air source to breathe, because automotive paint is far more harmful to the lungs than acrylic. Certain spray guns, called High-Volume Low-Pressure (HVLP) spray guns, are designed to deliver the same high volumes of paint without requiring such high pressures.

== Types ==
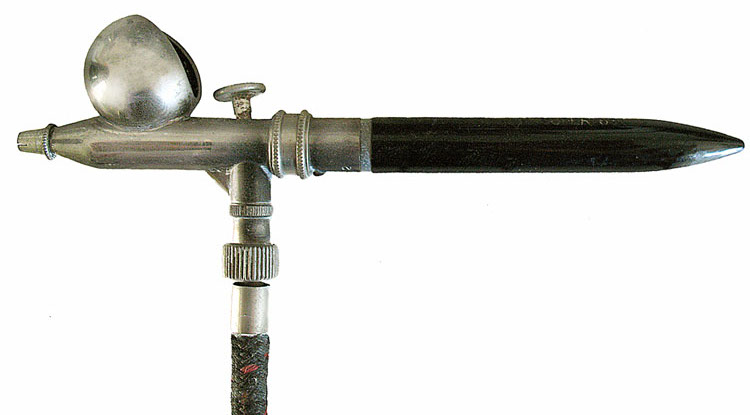
Aerograph Super 63, a gravity-fed, double-action, internal mix airbrush

Airbrushes are usually classified by three characteristics. The first characteristic is the action performed by the user to trigger the paint flow. The second is the mechanism for feeding the paint into the airbrush. The third is the point at which the paint and air mix.

=== Trigger action ===
Most airbrushes can be grouped into two types of trigger action: Single-action or double-action.

The simplest airbrushes work with a single-action mechanism, where the depression of the trigger actuates air flow through the airbrush, immediately outputting paint. The airbrush's color flow and spray pattern are adjusted separately from the trigger action. This is done through an adjustment of the airbrush's needle placement within its paint tip, by the turning of the paint tip on an external mix airbrush (Badger 350 or Paasche Model H are good examples of single-action external mix airbrushes) or the turning of a needle setting dial on an internal mix airbrush (Badger 200 or Iwata SAR are good examples of single-action internal mix airbrushes). The color volume and spray pattern are maintained at a fixed level until the airbrush user re-adjusts the setting. Adjusting the color volume and spray pattern while painting is possible, but not by design. Single-action airbrushes are simpler to use and are generally less expensive, but they present limitations in applications in which the user wishes to do something more artistic than simply apply a large, uniform coat of color.

Dual-action (or double-action) airbrushes enable the simultaneous adjustment of both air and color at the trigger, by allowing the user to actuate air by depressing the trigger and simultaneously adjust color and spray pattern by rocking the trigger back and forth. This ability to adjust color flow while spraying the airbrush, coupled with the user's adjustment of distance from the painting surface allows for the variation of fine to wide lines without stopping to re-adjust the spray pattern (as is necessary with a single-action airbrush). This allows for greater spray control and enables a wider variety of artistic effects. The use of this type of airbrush requires practice to achieve proficiency, both with triggering technique and control. The effort is worthwhile, as airbrushing offers greater artistic versatility. Dual-action airbrushes (Badger Patriot 105, Paasche VL, Iwata CM-C are all good examples of dual-action airbrushes) are of a more sophisticated design model than single-action airbrushes, which tends to make them the more expensive of the two.

=== Feed system ===
Paint can be fed into the airbrush by gravity from a paint reservoir sitting atop the airbrush (called gravity feed or top feed), or siphoned from a reservoir mounted below (bottom/suction/siphon feed), or on the side (side feed). Each feed type carries unique advantages and disadvantages. Gravity feed airbrushes require less air pressure to operate, as gravity helps assist the flow of paint into the mixing chamber. Typically instruments with the finest mist atomization and detail requirements use this method since less air pressure allows for finer control of paint flow and less overspray. However, the paint capacity of gravity feed airbrushes is limited. Side- and bottom-feed airbrushes allow the artist to see over the top of the airbrush, with the former sometimes offering left-handed and right-handed options to suit the artist. The bottom paint reservoir can be a variety of sizes, and so a bottom feed airbrush typically holds a larger capacity of paint than the other types, and is often preferable for larger scale work such as automotive applications and clothing design. Side feed airbrushes are a hybrid of the two, and are able to use both a gravity style cup or a suction-style bottle.

=== Mix point ===
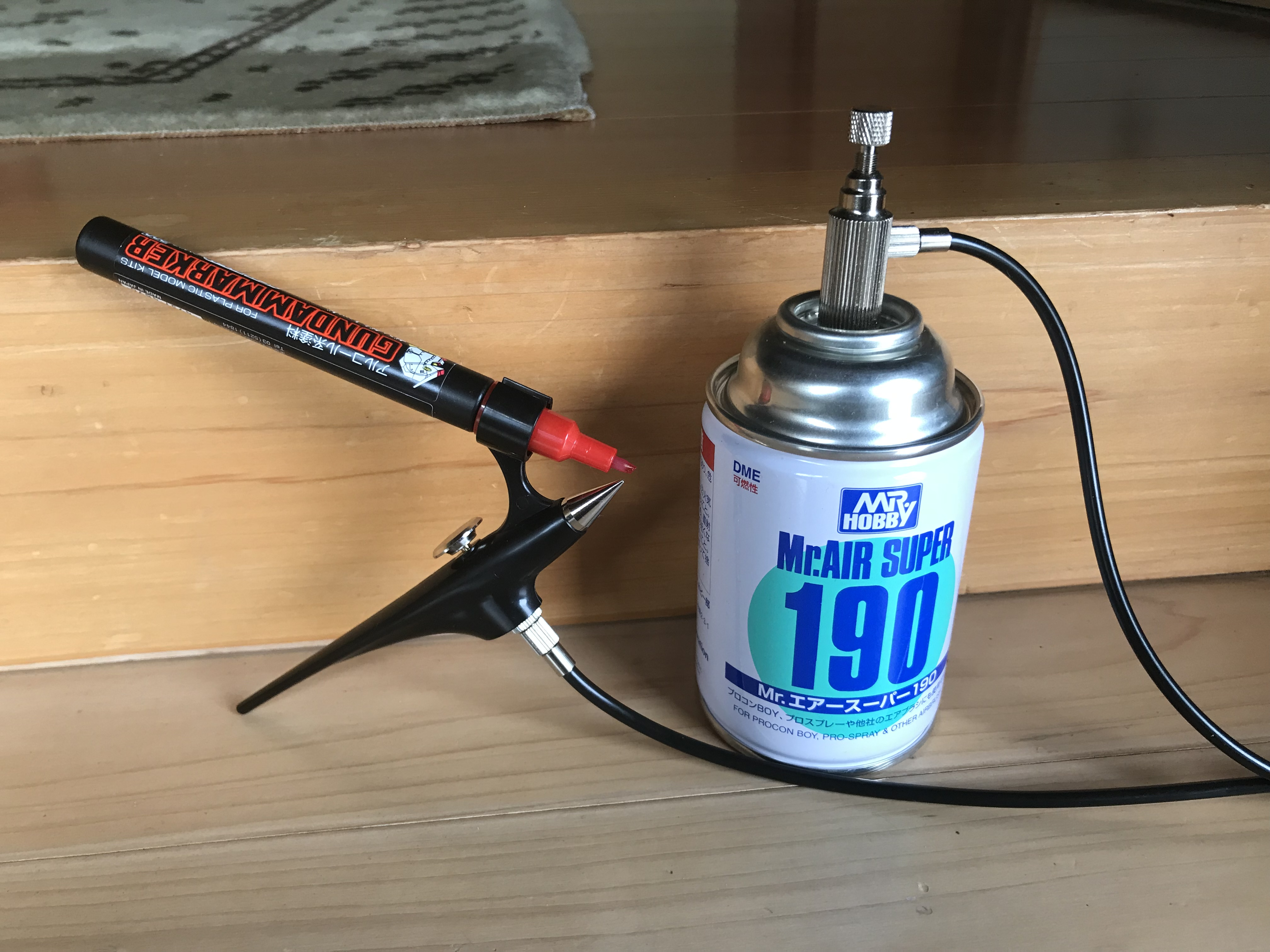
External mix airbrush with air can

Airbrushes can be divided into internal mix and external mix. With an internal mix airbrush, the paint and air mix inside the airbrush body (in the tip), creating a finer atomized "mist" of paint. With an external mix airbrush, the air and paint meet outside of the tip before mixing with each other, which creates a larger, coarser atomization pattern. External mix airbrushes are cheaper and more suited for covering larger areas with more viscous paints or varnishes, while internal mix airbrushes are more expensive and more suited for fine detail work with thinner paints.

== Spray guns ==
The airbrush led to the development of the spray gun: a similar device that typically delivers a higher volume of paint and for painting larger areas.

The first paint spraying machine was developed in 1887.

Equipment by DeVilbiss and Binks is typical of modern sprayguns.

The addition of a simple pistol grip adapter to an aerosol paint spray can create a cheap alternative to a spray gun.

== Technique ==
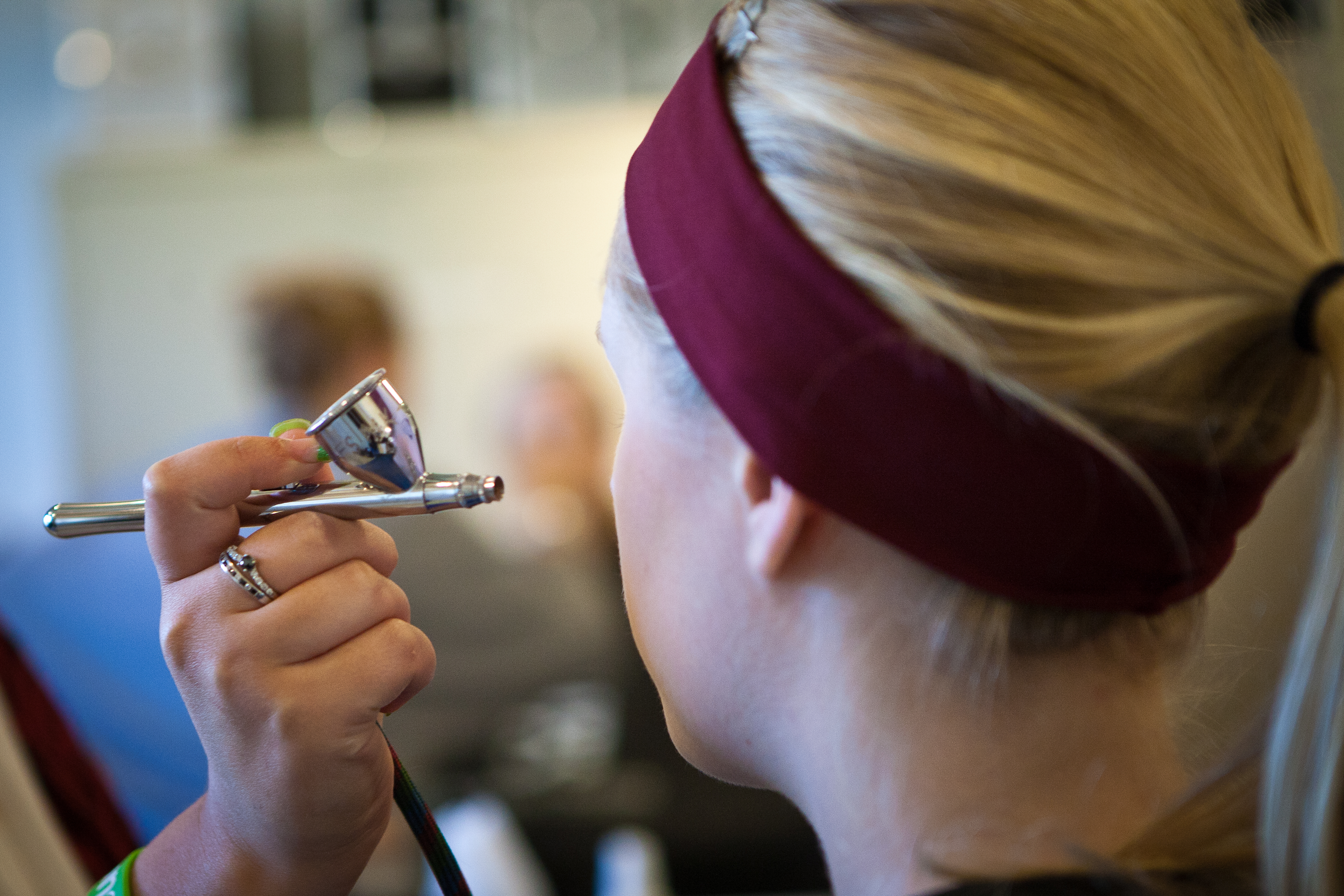

Airbrush technique is the freehand manipulation of the airbrush, medium, air pressure, and distance from the surface being sprayed in order to produce a certain predictable result on a consistent basis with or without shields or stencils. Airbrush technique will differ with the type of airbrush being used (single-action or dual/double-action).

Double-action airbrush technique involves depressing the trigger on the top of the airbrush with the index finger to release air only, and drawing it back gradually to the paint release threshold. The most important procedural dynamic is to always begin with air only and end with air only. By observing this rule, precise control of paint volume and line width and character can be achieved. The single most important airbrush stroke consistently utilized by professionals is the dagger stroke. This describes a stroke which begins wide and ends as a narrow line, created by starting with the brush far from the support and moving it evenly closer as the line is drawn.

Single-action airbrush technique derives its name from the fact that only one action is required for operation. The single action of depressing the trigger releases a fixed ratio of paint to air. Achieving different line widths requires either changing the tip and nozzle combination or adjusting the spray volume manually between spray width changes. The most important aspect of proper single-action airbrush technique is to keep the hand moving before the trigger is depressed and after the trigger is released. This avoids the "bar bell" line.

== Use ==
=== Art and illustration ===
Since the inception of airbrush technology, commercial artists and illustrators realized airbrushes allowed them to create highly rendered images and a high level of realism. Artists often use the airbrush in combination with cut stencils or items held freehand to block in a controlled manner the flow of paint onto the paper (or digital alternatives). Airbrush images can be found in advertising, publishing (e.g., book covers), comic books and graphic novels, and is popular among fantasy and science fiction artists.

=== Photo retouching ===
Airbrushing was long used to alter photographs in the pre-digital era, and prior to airbrush a similar effect was achieved through the use of a pastel type of crayon. The very first design by Stanley alluded to this: "My invention relates to such improvements in atomizers that may be employed for finishing photographs in water-colors, india-ink, and crayon". In skilled hands an airbrush can be used to help hide signs that an image has been extensively retouched or "doctored".

In the 20th century Soviet Union, as a result of Stalin's purges and later destalinization, many photographs of officials from the periods show extensive airbrushing; often entire human figures have been removed. The term "airbrushed out" has come to mean rewriting history to pretend that something was never there. In contemporary academic discourse, the process of removing components from an image is formally known as object removal.

The term "airbrushed" or "airbrushed photo" has also been used to describe glamour photos in which a model's imperfections have been removed, or in which their attributes have been enhanced. The term has often been applied in a pejorative manner to describe images of unrealistic female perfection and has been particularly common in reference to pictures in Playboy, and later Maxim.

Using digital imaging technology, this kind of picture editing is now usually done with a raster image editor, which is capable of even more subtle work in the hands of a skilled touch-up artist. In the fine retouching industry, the airbrushing technique is often considered a low-end practice, with significantly inferior quality to that found in the most important fashion photography publications.

=== Murals ===
Airbrushes are also suitable for painting murals.

=== Hobby ===
Airbrushes are commonly used by scale modeling enthusiasts to paint models because finer coats can be laid down, as well as opaque effects like weathering, adding stains etc. The fine atomization of paint in modern airbrushes also makes it possible to accurately reproduce soft-edged mottled camouflage schemes, which are very hard to do convincingly by hand-brushing (Luftwaffe aircraft are a good example of this).

Many radio-controlled model hobbyists also use the airbrush to create works of art on the Lexan bodies. The paint jobs range from a basic one-color paint job to fine detailed works of art.

Airbrushes have also become common tools in cosplay, costuming, and prop-making.

=== Airbrush makeup application ===
==== History ====
Airbrushed makeup was used in Hollywood movies at least as early as the 1930s. Monte Westmore is sometimes credited with developing the technique for Gone With the Wind, but his brother Wally was using it at least five years earlier in Pre-Code films such as Murder at the Vanities.

Airbrush makeup has recently been re-popularized by the advent of high-definition television and digital photography, wherein the camera sees more detail than ever before. Liquid foundations that are high in coverage but thin in texture are applied with the airbrush for full coverage without a heavy build-up of product. It is also a highly popular technique for special effects makeup as well as for the funeral industry.

Alcohol-based mediums are best suited for waterproof make-up; this makeup lasts longer, is smudge proof, is rich and opaque in colour. But alcohol-based foundations can be too matte, and can lead to over-drying of the skin. They also can rub off due to excessive itching or fidgeting.

Water-based makeup are most commonly used for clown make-up. Water-based makeup requires minimal effort to apply and remove. Water-based makeup is short lived and comes off easily.

Silicone-based airbrush foundation, S/B foundation, is found in professional and premium retail airbrush brands, primarily for bridal make-ups, or mature skin. Silicone based foundations have the advantage of being medium to high coverage.

Silicone-based airbrush foundation has another advantage of mimicking the skin texture, as to give no obvious sign of make-up, thereby giving a more natural look to the model.

Silicone-based airbrush foundations are comparatively water-resistant but not waterproof; they do not overdry the skin, and are relatively easy to apply and remove with a mild make-up remover.

In special effects makeup, airbrushes are the predominant tool for applying paint to prosthetic appliances. This method offers several advantages over traditional brushwork, including the minimization of edge peeling, the prevention of underlayer disturbance, and the reduced risk of damage to delicate prosthetic pieces. Furthermore, airbrushing facilitates the creation of translucent layers, crucial for achieving realistic skin tones and textures on foam and rubber-based prosthetics. Diverse airbrushing techniques and stencil utilization enable the application of intricate patterns, enhancing the lifelike quality of the final makeup effect.

=== Temporary airbrush tattoos (TATs) ===
Airbrushes can also be used to apply temporary airbrush tattoos. An artist sprays ink onto the skin through a stencil. Often, the resulting design mirrors the look of a permanent tattoo, without any pain or discomfort. In the past, TATs might only last a week, but now, the best inks can last up to two weeks or longer.

=== Airbrush tanning ===
Airbrushes are used to apply special tanning solutions as a form of sunless tanning that simulates the appearance of a natural sun tan. It is promoted as a safer and healthier alternative to the damaging effects of long term exposure to the sun. It is often performed by companies also offering other sun tanning alternatives like sun beds.

=== Finger nail art ===
Airbrushes are also used to apply images onto human finger nails as well as synthetic ones that are later glued to the person's actual finger nail.

=== Clothing ===
T-shirt airbrushing is popular—many T-shirt airbrush shops offer to paint any textile that will hold paint, including jeans, denim jackets, leather apparel, pillow cases, and hoodies.

One well-known producer of airbrushed clothing is Marc Ecko, who used to airbrush T-shirts when he started his clothing company.

=== Automotive ===
Airbrushes are used to spray murals, graphics, and other artwork on automobiles, motorcycles and helmets. This art form has been around since at least the fifties, but more recently it has seen an increase in popularity thanks to such shows as Rides and American Chopper. Most professionals prefer to use automotive grade bases through top-of-the-line gravity fed airbrushes. The cost to hire a professional artist will vary from a few hundred to several thousand dollars, depending on location, skill level and reputation.

=== Planetary cartography ===
Airbrush was a novel technique in the scientific portraying of the Moon and other planets in the 1960s. Airbrush maps were produced by USGS Astrogeology Branch to support the NASA Apollo missions.

=== Street artists ===
Many street artists use airbrushing to create names and pictures for tourists, such as around Jackson Square in New Orleans. In the mid-1970s, Panama City Beach, Florida was the airbrush capital of the world, with hundreds of artists painting custom designs on T-shirts.

== Safety ==
When inhaled, finely dispersed paint and solvents can produce serious health hazards. Regulatory provisions such as those issued by the U.S. Occupational Safety and Health Administration dictate strict requirements to prevent unsafe use in work environments.

== See also ==
- Atomizer – more detail and applications on the atomizer
- Frederick William Lawrence – an early airbrush artist
- Syd Brak – a contemporary airbrush artist
- H. R. Giger – Swiss sculptor, airbrush, and sketch artist, who is famous for his work on the feature films, Alien and Species
- Airbrush Action Magazine – established in 1985, longest running publication for airbrushing and custom culture
- Aerosol paint – similar technique with pressurised aerosol propellant in a can
- List of art techniques
- Alberto Vargas - airbrush artist, and the Vargas Award named after him awarded annually by Airbrush Action Magazine
- Man Ray, an airbrush art pioneer
- Cassandre, another airbrush art pioneer
