= Munro House =

Coordinates: 53.796823°N 1.533896°W

Munro House is a building in Leeds, West Yorkshire, England, situated at the corner of Duke Street and York Street.

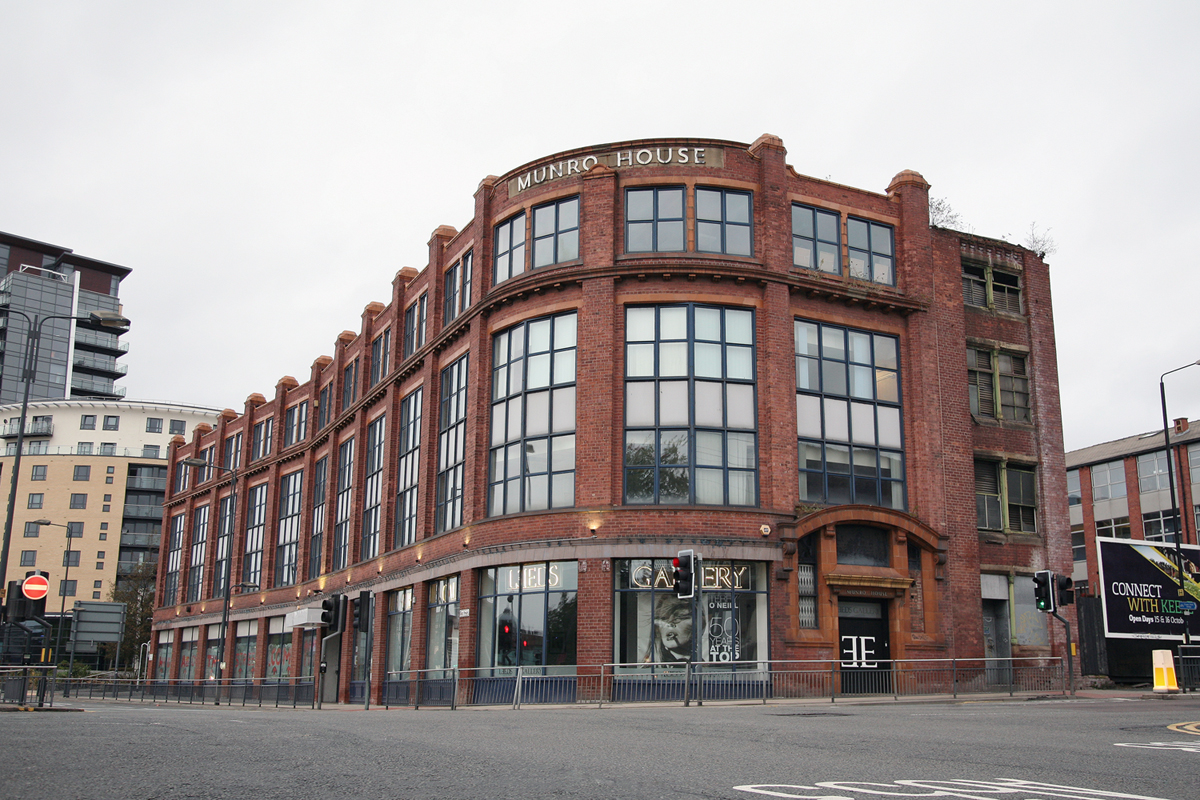
Munro House in 2011.

== History ==
Originally called Union House, during the 1930s the building housed The United Yeast Co. Ltd, yeast merchants.

The ground floor was occupied by Walter Wraggs motor cycle dealers during the 1960s and 1970s and at that time much of the rest of the building was used by the tailoring industry.

During the 1990s and 2000s the building contained Ad Trader, Ad Trader (Yorkshire), and Yorkshire Auto Trader's offices. It was also the location for a number of other small businesses and charities.

The area surrounding Munro House is now known as modern Leeds' Cultural Centre. Following the redevelopment of Quarry Hill and the construction of The West Yorkshire Playhouse, St Peter's Square became home to BBC Yorkshire, Leeds College of Music, Northern Ballet, Yorkshire Dance and The Wardrobe. It is also unofficially known as the 'Arts Quarter'.

== Current ==
From 2011 until September 2022 the ground floor was home Café 164, an independent bakery and coffee shop with outlets on Woodhouse Lane and in Headingley its last trading day was Friday 26 August 2022, they have now moved their main operations to Headingley.

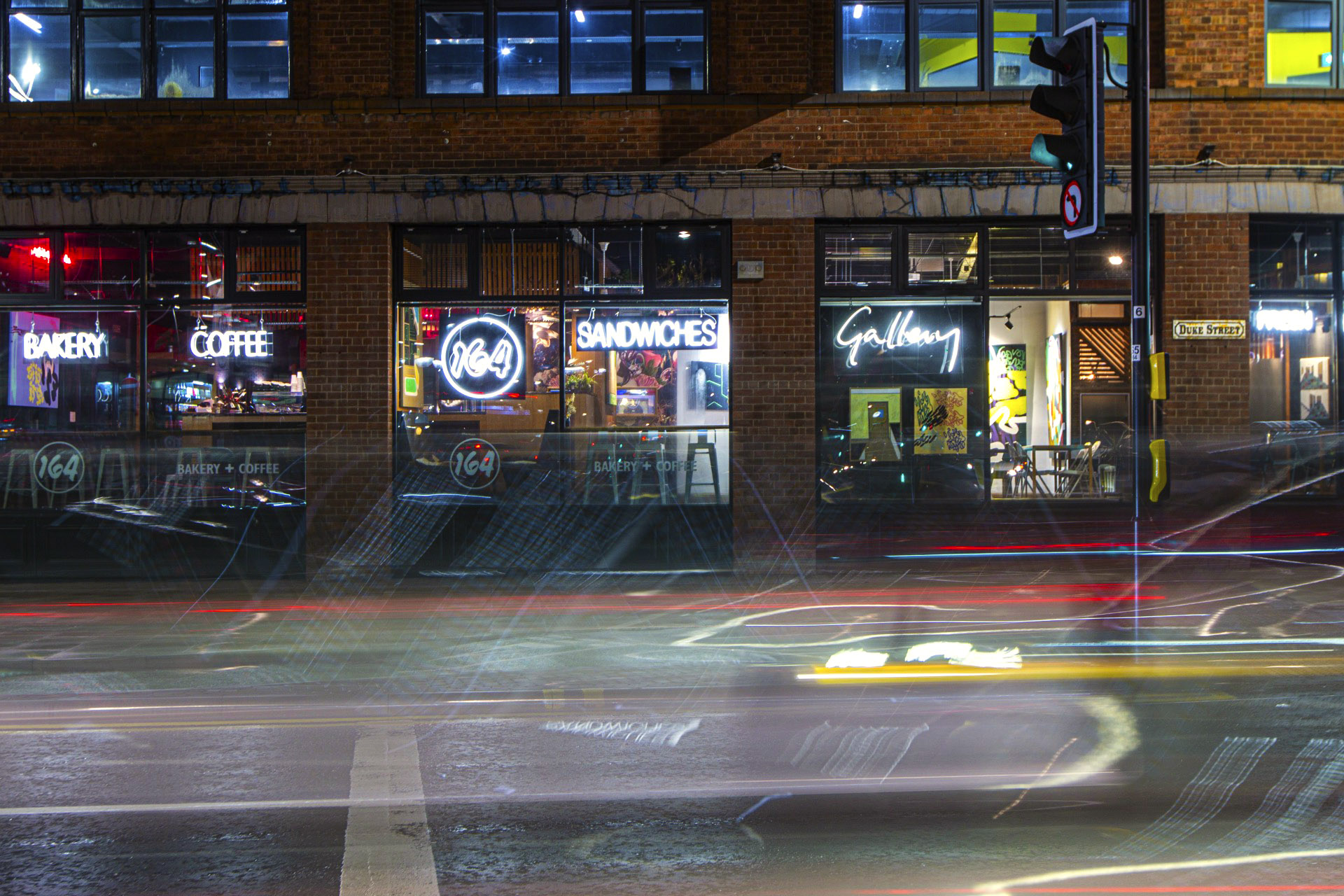
Café 164 and The Gallery at 164, December 2019

At the south corner of the building was Leeds Gallery, an independent commercial art gallery., the gallery changed its name to The Gallery at 164, but never reopened after COVID-19. Next door was Colours May Vary, an independent book shop, which moved to a new location in the Corn Exchange in 2021 - this space is now occupied by an office of La Marzocco, the Italian coffee machine manufacturer. Sarto, a pasta restaurant, is on the St Peter's Square side.

On the first floor is Engage Interactive, a digital agency. On the top floor are Magpie, a communications agency, ODI Leeds a node of the Open Data Institute and The Data City

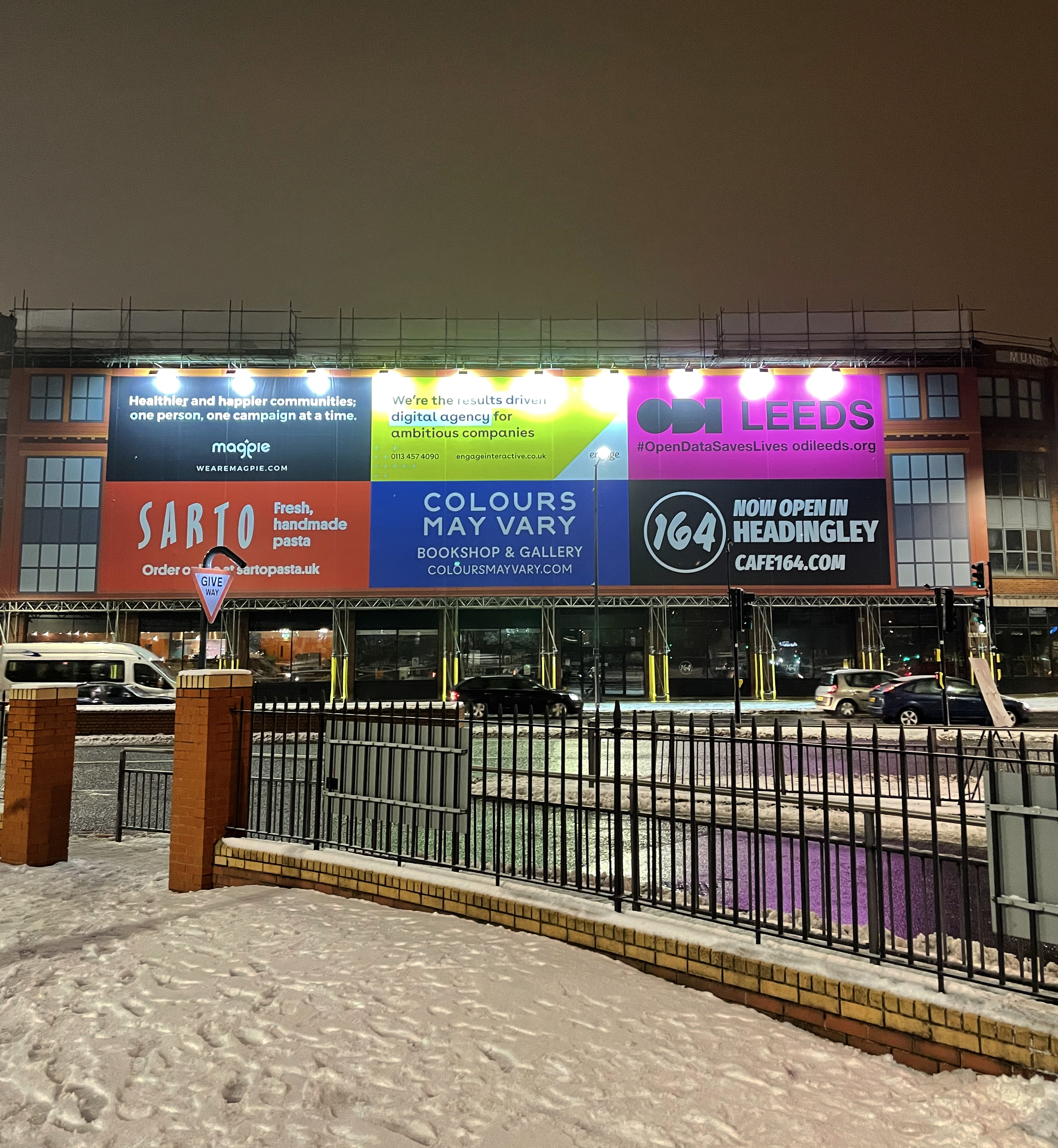
Munro House, January 2021
