= Frederick William Lawrence =

Canadian airbrush painter

Frederick William Lawrence (1892-1974) was a Canadian American airbrush painter, and probably the father of realistic spray painting.

Formerly an officer of the Royal Canadian Mounted Police (RCMP), he served with the Canadian Army in World War I, where he was severely wounded. After months of hospitalization, he was shipped home to Canada. Once he fully recovered, he moved to Michigan, where he worked for Pontiac Motor Company, where he learned to finish cars and to operate a Duco spray gun.

Around 1930, he moved to Oklahoma City, Oklahoma, where he worked as an auto body refinisher, and began to experiment with painting pictures using the spray gun during breaks.

As he honed his skills, he was featured in various science magazines, Time and on Ripley's Believe It Or Not. Lawrence began giving performances at automobile shows, spray painting realistic portraits and landscapes in less than an hour. As more airbrush artists began copying his techniques, however, the novelty of his work began to fade, and by World War II, Lawrence was one of thousands of commercial airbrush artists, and died in relative obscurity.
