= Mixer =

Mixer may refer to:

== Electronics ==
- DJ mixer, a type of audio mixing console used by disc jockeys
- Electronic mixer, electrical circuit for combining signal voltages
- Frequency mixer, electrical circuit that creates new frequencies from two signals applied to it
- Mixing console, an electronic device for combining sounds of different audio signals
- Mix engineer, person who combines elements of recorded music into a final version
- Mode scrambler, known as a mode mixer, telecommunications device for inducing mode coupling in an optical fiber
- Sound card mixer, analog part of a sound card that routes and mixes sound signals
- Vision mixer, an electronic device for combining video signals

== Industrial and lab equipment ==
- Concrete mixer, a machine which combines the ingredients of concrete, a.k.a. cement mixer
- Feed mixer, for mixing feed ingredients
- High-shear mixer, a device that disperse, or transports one phase or ingredient (liquid, solid, gas) into a main continuous phase (liquid)
- High viscosity mixer
- Impinging mixer, part of a reaction injection molding system
- Industrial mixer, a machine for mixing the materials in industrial scale
- Static mixer, a device for mixing two fluid materials through a tube containing a series of baffles
- Submersible mixer, a machine used for mixing liquids and slurries in tanks (e.g. wastewater, liquid manure, etc.)
- Vortex mixer, a laboratory device

== Entertainment ==
- Mixer (service), a defunct interactive video game streaming platform by Microsoft
- Mixer dance, a kind of participation dance that involves changing partners
- Production sound mixer, the head of a film production sound crew
- Mixer (album), a 2012 album by Desario
- "The Mixer", a 1991 song by The Fall from Shift-Work
- The Mixer, a short story collection by Edgar Wallace (1927)
- The Mixer, a 1992 TV series based on the story by Edgar Wallace, starring Simon Williams

== Other ==
- Mixer (appliance), kitchen appliance used to combine ingredients
- Mixer (engine), a device for quieting an airplane engine
- Drink mixer, non-alcoholic ingredients in mixed drinks and cocktails
- Mixer, an alternate name for a singles event

== See also ==
- Mix (disambiguation)
