= The Mix =

The Mix may refer to:

- The Mix (Kraftwerk album) (1991)
- The Mix (Gary Numan album) (1998)
- The Mix (Monchy & Alexandra album) (2003)
- The Mix (film) (2000)
- The Mix (TV series), a 2014 Australian television show
- The Mix (charity), a digital charity in the United Kingdom
- The Mix (Tacoma, Washington), a gay bar in the United States

== See also ==
- In the Mix (disambiguation)
- Mix (disambiguation)
- Mixx (disambiguation)
