= Mix =

Mix, MIX, mixes, or mixing may refer to:

== Audio and music ==
- Audio mixing (recorded music), the process of combining and balancing multiple sound sources
- DJ mix, a sequence of musical tracks mixed to appear as one continuous track
- Mixtape, a compilation of songs or tracks
- Remix, a variation of a song
- Mix, short way to refer to the Mixolydian mode.
- Mix (magazine), a periodical for the professional recording and sound production technology industry

=== Albums ===
- Mixes (Transvision Vamp album), 1992
- Mixes (Kylie Minogue album), a 1998 remix album by Australian singer-songwriter Kylie Minogue
- Mix (Stellar album), a 1999 studio album by New Zealand pop rock band Stellar
- Mixes, a 2008 self-released album by C418

== Computing ==
- Mix (build tool), a build tool for working with the Elixir programming language
- MIX (email), a high performance email storage system for use with IMAP
- MIX (abstract machine), the computer and the instruction set architecture used in the textbook The Art of Computer Programming by Donald Knuth
- MIX (Microsoft), a discontinued annual Microsoft conference
- Mix network, an anonymous email system proposed by David Chaum in 1981
- Malta Internet Exchange, an Internet backbone for the country of Malta
- Milan Internet eXchange, in Milan, Italy
- MIX (Z39.87): NISO Metadata for Images in XML

== Radio and television ==
- Discovery Mix, a defunct Swedish television channel
- Mix FM (disambiguation)
- Mix (radio station), a radio station in New Zealand
- MIX (XM), a commercial-free channel on XM Satellite Radio
- Mix (Malaysian radio station), a radio station in Malaysia
- MixRadio, an online music streaming service
- Mix TV, a Brazilian television music channel aimed at young people
- Sky One Mix, the former name of British television channel Sky Replay
- Sky Sports Mix, a TV channel
- Sony Mix, an Indian television music channel

== People ==
- Mix Diskerud (born 1990), Norwegian-American soccer player
- Mix (surname)

== Places ==
- Mix camp, an informal settlement in Namibia
- Mix, Louisiana, an unincorporated community
- Mix Run, Pennsylvania, village

== Science ==
- Mixing (mathematics), a concept in ergodic theory
- Mixing (physics), a descriptive condition of a dynamical system
- Mixing (process engineering), a unit operation for manipulating physical systems
- Crossbreeding, also called mixing, a genetic concept

== Other ==
- MIX, the Roman numeral for the number 1009 or year 1009
- Microfinance Information Exchange (MIX), a non-profit business information provider in the microfinance sector
- MIX NYC, a nonprofit organization dedicated to queer experimental film
- Mix (manga), a 2012 baseball shōnen manga series by Mitsuru Adachi
- The Mix (charity), in the U.K.
- Mixed Doubles, also known as Mix, a 2017 Japanese film
- Zeekr Mix, a battery electric minivan

== See also ==
- The Mix (disambiguation)
- Mixe (disambiguation)
- Mixed (disambiguation)
- Mixer (disambiguation)
- Mixture (disambiguation)
- Mixx (disambiguation)
- MYX (disambiguation)
- Myx, a Filipino cable TV channel
