= Powder coating =

Type of coating applied as a free-flowing, dry powder

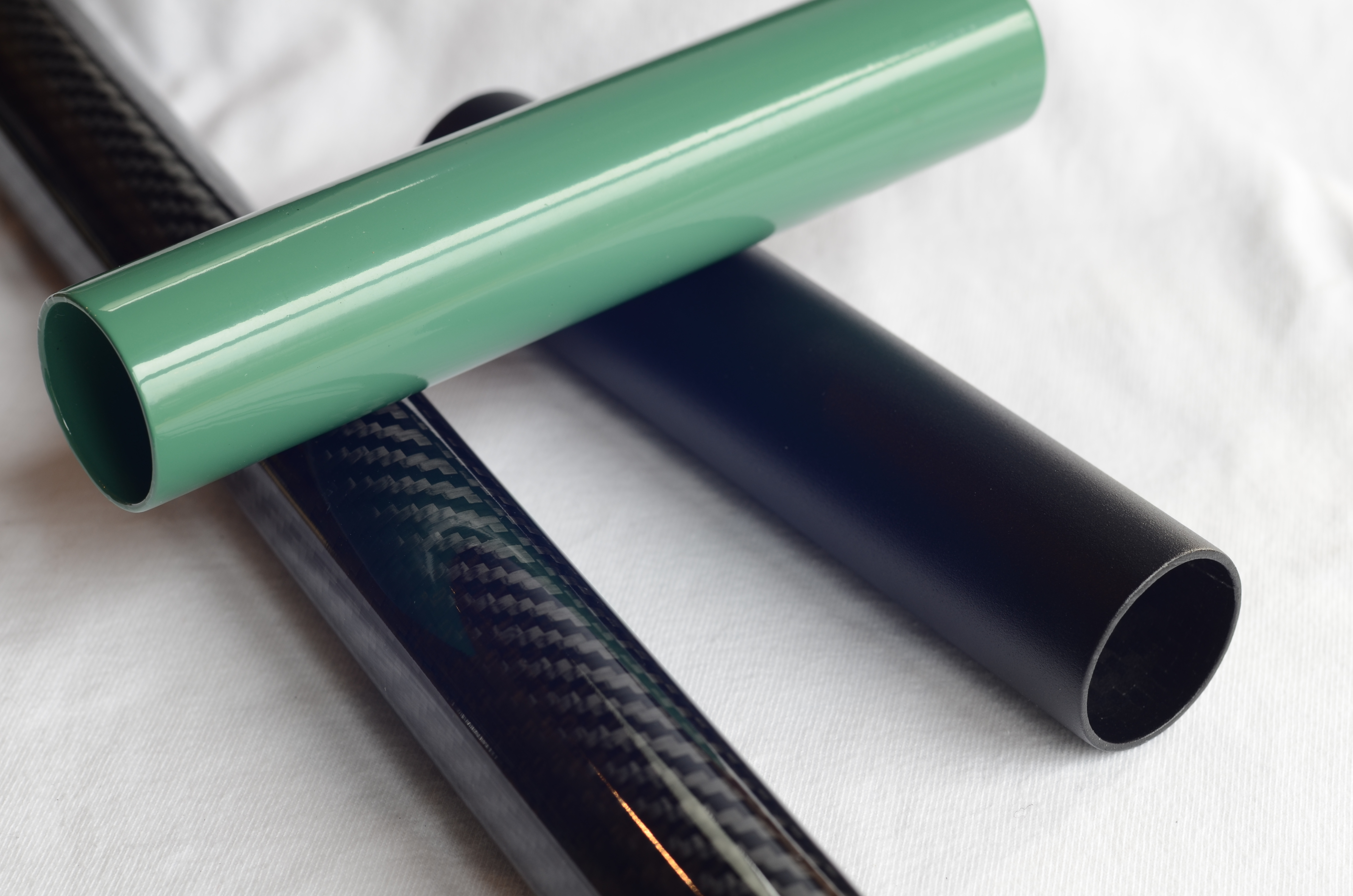
Heat-sensitive carbon fiber tubes coated with a UV curable powder coating.

Powder coating is a type of coating that is applied as a free-flowing, dry powder. Unlike conventional liquid paint, which is delivered via an evaporating solvent, powder coating is typically applied electrostatically and then cured under heat or with ultraviolet light. The powder may be a thermoplastic or a thermosetting polymer. It is usually used to create a thick, tough finish that is more durable than conventional paint. Powder coating is mainly used for coating of metal objects, particularly those subject to rough use. Advancements in powder coating technology like UV-curable powder coatings allow for other materials such as plastics, composites, carbon fiber, medium-density fibreboard (MDF), and solid wood to be powder coated, as little heat or oven dwell time is required to process them.

== History, properties, and uses of powder coating ==
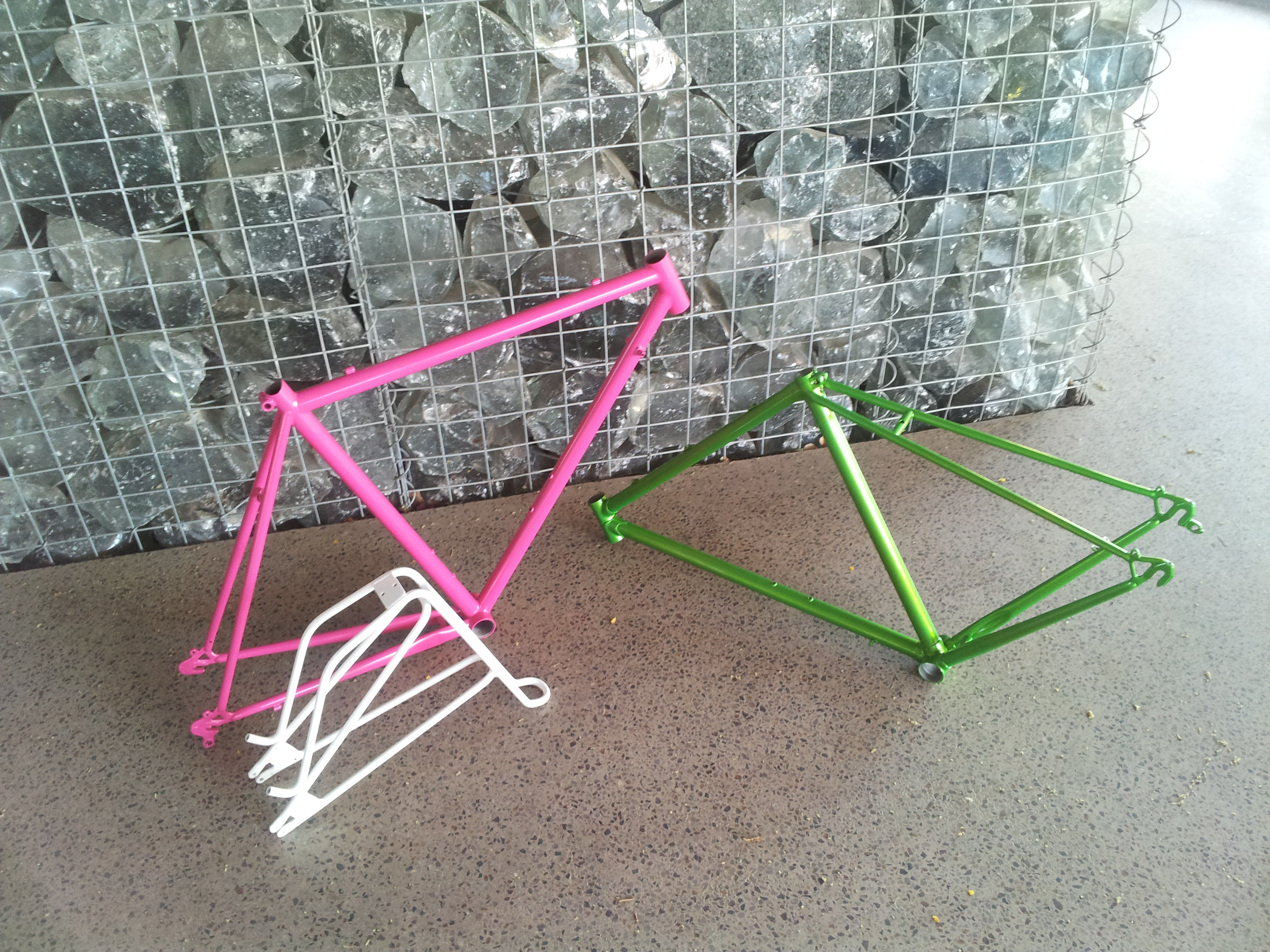
Powder coated bicycle frames and parts

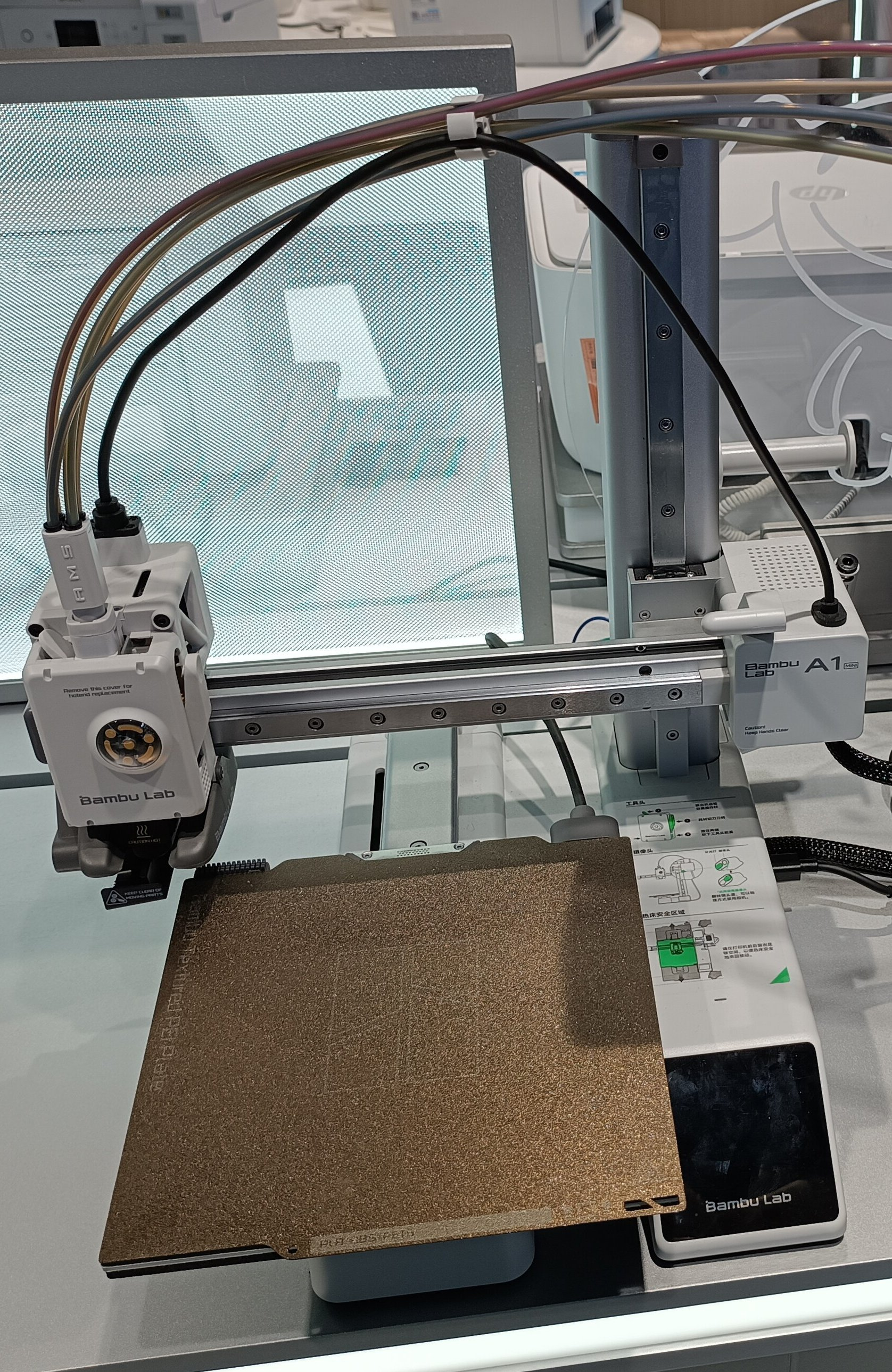
PEI powder-coated build plate on a Bambu Lab A1 mini FFF 3D printer

The powder coating process was invented around 1945 by Daniel Gustin and received US Patent 2538562 in 1945. This process coats an object electrostatically and then cures it with heat, creating a finish harder and tougher than conventional paint. Originally used on metal manufactures, such as household appliances, aluminium extrusions, drum hardware, automobile parts, and bicycle frames, the practice of powder coating has been expanded to allow finishing of other materials.

Because powder coating does not have a liquid carrier, it can produce thicker coatings than conventional liquid coatings without running or sagging, and powder coating produces minimal appearance differences between horizontally coated surfaces and vertically coated surfaces. Further, because no carrier fluid evaporates away, the coating process emits few volatile organic compounds (VOC). Finally, several powder colors can be applied before all are cured together, allowing color blending and special bleed effects in a single layer.

While it is relatively easy to apply thick coatings that cure to smooth, texture-free coating, it is not as easy to apply smooth thin films. As the film thickness is reduced, the film becomes more and more orange peeled in texture because of the particle size and glass transition temperature (Tg) of the powder.

Most powder coatings have a particle size in the range of 2 to 50 μm, a softening temperature Tg around 80 °C, and a melting temperature around 150 °C, and are cured at around 200 °C for a minimum of 10 minutes to 15 minutes (exact temperatures and times may depend on the thickness of the item being coated). For such powder coatings, film build-ups of greater than 50 μm may be required to obtain an acceptably smooth film. The surface texture which is considered desirable or acceptable depends on the end product. Many manufacturers prefer to have a certain degree of orange peel since it helps to hide metal defects that have occurred during manufacture, and the resulting coating is less prone to showing fingerprints.

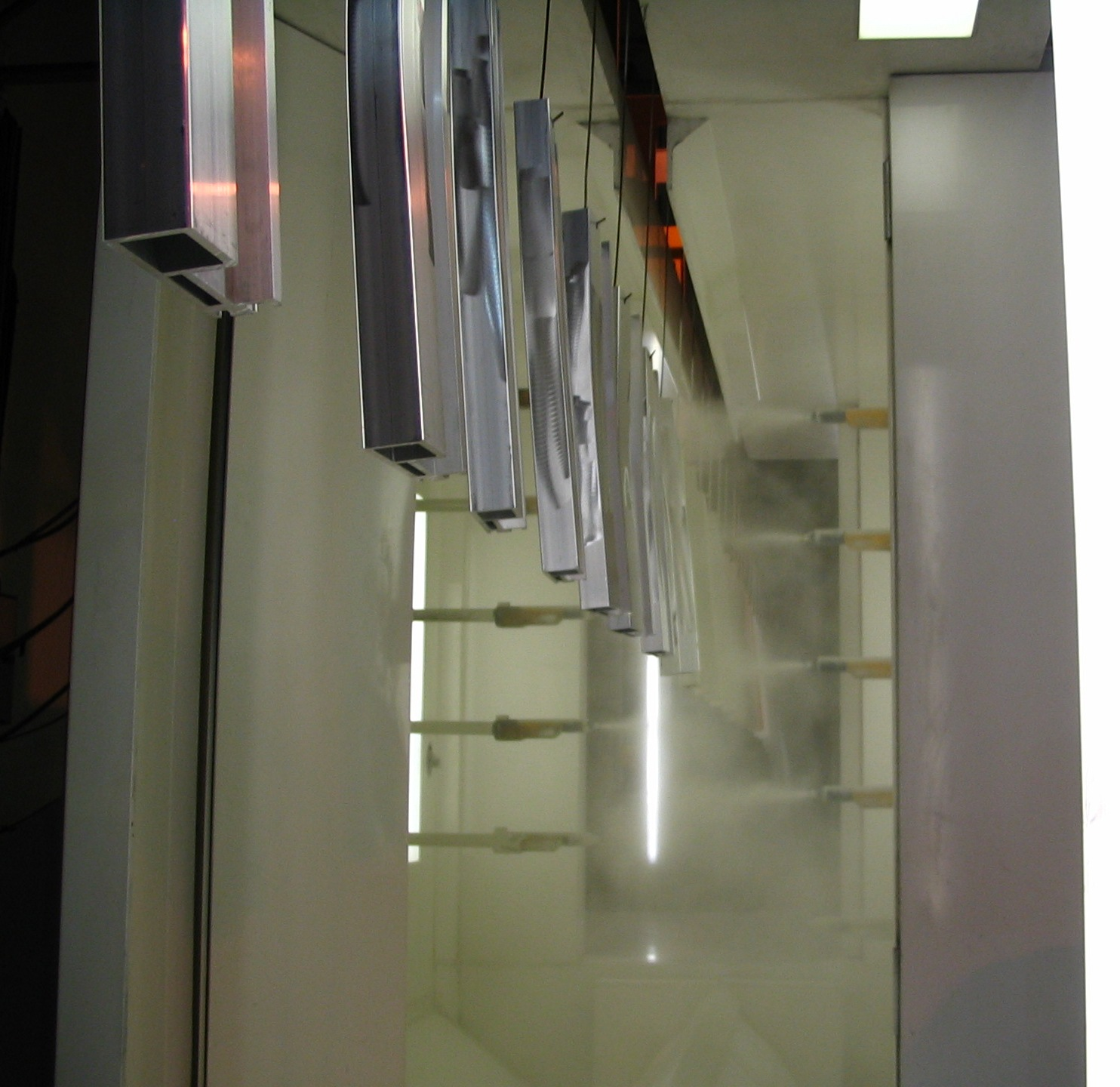
Aluminium extrusions being powder coated

There are very specialized operations that apply powder coatings of less than 30 μm or with a Tg below 40 °C in order to produce smooth thin films. One variation of the dry powder coating process, the Powder Slurry process, combines the advantages of powder coatings and liquid coatings by dispersing very fine powders of 1–5 μm sized particles into water, which then allows very smooth, low-film-thickness coatings to be produced.

For small-scale jobs, "rattle can" spray paint is less expensive and complex than powder coating. At the professional scale, the capital expense and time required for a powder coat gun, booth and oven are similar to those for a spray gun system. Powder coatings do have a major advantage in that the overspray can be recycled. However, if multiple colors are being sprayed in a single spray booth, this may limit the ability to recycle the overspray.

== Advantages over other coating processes ==
1. Powder coatings contain no solvents and release little or no amount of volatile organic compounds (VOC) into the atmosphere. Thus, there is no need for finishers to buy costly pollution control equipment. Companies can comply more easily and economically with environmental regulations, such as those issued by the U.S. Environmental Protection Agency.
2. Powder coatings can produce much thicker coatings than conventional liquid coatings without running or sagging.
3. Powder coated items generally have fewer appearance differences than liquid coated items between horizontally coated surfaces and vertically coated surfaces.
4. A wide range of speciality effects are easily accomplished using powder coatings that would be impossible to achieve with other coating processes.
5. Curing time is significantly faster with powder coatings compared to liquid coatings especially when using ultraviolet cured powder coatings or advanced low bake thermosetting powders.

== Types of powder coating ==
There are three main categories of powder coatings: thermosets, thermoplastics, and UV curable powder coatings. Thermoset powder coatings incorporate a cross-linker into the formulation.

Most common cross-linkers are solid epoxy resins in so-called hybrid powders in mixing ratios of 50/50, 60/40 and 70/30 (polyester resin/ epoxy resin) for indoor applications and triglycidyl isocyanurate (TGIC) in a ratio of 93/7 and β-hydroxy alkylamide (HAA) hardener in 95/5 ratio for outdoor applications. When the powder is baked, it reacts with other chemical groups in the powder to polymerize, improving the performance properties. The chemical cross-linking for hybrids and TGIC powders—representing the major part of the global powder coating market—is based on the reaction of organic acid groups with an epoxy functionality; this carboxy–epoxy reaction is thoroughly investigated and well understood, by addition of catalysts the conversion can be accelerated and curing schedule can be triggered in time and/or temperature. In the powder coating industry it is common to use catalyst masterbatches where 10–15% of the active ingredient is introduced into a polyester carrier resin as matrix. This approach provides the best possible even dispersion of a small amount of a catalyst over the bulk of the powder. Concerning the cross-linking of the TGIC-free alternative based on HAA hardeners, there is no known catalyst available.

For special applications like coil coatings or clear coats it is common to use glycidylesters as hardener component; their cross-linking is based on the carboxy–epoxy chemistry too. A different chemical reaction is used in so-called polyurethane powders, where the binder resin carries hydroxyl functional groups that react with isocyanate groups of the hardener component. The isocyanate group is usually introduced into the powder in blocked form where the isocyanate functionality is pre-reacted with ε-caprolactame as blocking agent or in form of uretdiones, at elevated temperatures (deblocking temperature) the free isocyanate groups are released and available for the cross-linking reaction with hydroxyl functionality.

In general all thermosetting powder formulations contain next to the binder resin and cross-linker additives to support flow out and levelling and for degassing. Common is the use of flow promoter where the active ingredient—a polyacrylate—is absorbed on silica as carrier or as masterbatch dispersed in a polyester resin as matrix. Vast majority of powders contain benzoin as degassing agent to avoid pinholes in final powder coating film.

The thermoplastic variety does not undergo any additional actions during the baking process as it flows to form the final coating. UV-curable powder coatings are photopolymerisable materials containing a chemical photoinitiator that instantly responds to UV light energy by initiating the reaction that leads to crosslinking or cure. The differentiating factor of this process from others is the separation of the melt stage before the cure stage. UV-cured powder will melt in 60 to 120 seconds when reaching a temperature 110 °C and 130 °C. Once the melted coating is in this temperature window, it is instantly cured when exposed to UV light. UV powder coatings are processed in the fastest time and uses the least amount of energy compared to other powder coating technologies

The most common polymers used are polyester, polyurethane, polyester-epoxy (known as hybrid), straight epoxy (fusion bonded epoxy) and acrylics.

== Production ==
1. The polymer granules are mixed with hardener, pigments and other powder ingredients in an industrial mixer, such as a turbomixer
2. The mixture is heated in an extruder
3. The extruded mixture is rolled flat, cooled and broken into small chips
4. The chips are milled and sieved to make a fine powder

== Methodology ==
The powder coating process involves three basic steps: part preparation or the pre-treatment, the powder application, and curing.

=== Part preparation processes and equipment ===
Removal of oil, dirt, lubrication greases, metal oxides, welding scale etc. is essential prior to the powder coating process. It can be done by a variety of chemical and mechanical methods. The selection of the method depends on the size and the material of the part to be powder coated, the type of impurities to be removed and the performance requirement of the finished product. Some heat-sensitive plastics and composites have low surface tensions and plasma treating can be necessary to improve powder adhesion.

Chemical pre-treatments involve the use of phosphates or chromates in submersion or spray application. These often occur in multiple stages and consist of degreasing, etching, de-smutting, various rinses and the final phosphating or chromating of the substrate and new nanotechnology chemical bonding. The pre-treatment process both cleans and improves bonding of the powder to the metal. Recent additional processes have been developed that avoid the use of chromates, as these can be toxic to the environment. Titanium, zirconium and silanes offer similar performance against corrosion and adhesion of the powder.

In many high end applications, the part is electrocoated following the pretreatment process, and subsequent to the powder coating application. This has been particularly useful in automotive and other applications requiring high end performance characteristics.

Another method of preparing the surface prior to coating is known as abrasive blasting or sandblasting and shot blasting. Blast media and blasting abrasives are used to provide surface texturing and preparation, etching, finishing, and degreasing for products made of wood, plastic, or glass. The most important properties to consider are chemical composition and density; particle shape and size; and impact resistance.

Silicon carbide grit blast medium is brittle, sharp, and suitable for grinding metals and low-tensile strength, non-metallic materials. Plastic media blast equipment uses plastic abrasives that are sensitive to substrates such as aluminum, but still suitable for de-coating and surface finishing. Sand blast medium uses high-purity crystals that have low-metal content. Glass bead blast medium contains glass beads of various sizes.

Cast steel shot or steel grit is used to clean and prepare the surface before coating. Shot blasting recycles the media and is environmentally friendly. This method of preparation is highly efficient on steel parts such as I-beams, angles, pipes, tubes and large fabricated pieces.

Different powder coating applications can require alternative methods of preparation such as abrasive blasting prior to coating. The online consumer market typically offers media blasting services coupled with their coating services at additional costs.

A recent development for the powder coating industry is the use of plasma pretreatment for heat-sensitive plastics and composites. These materials typically have low-energy surfaces, are hydrophobic, and have a low degree of wetability which all negatively impact coating adhesion. Plasma treatment physically cleans, etches, and provides chemically active bonding sites for coatings to anchor to. The result is a hydrophilic, wettable surface that is amenable to coating flow and adhesion.

=== Powder application processes ===
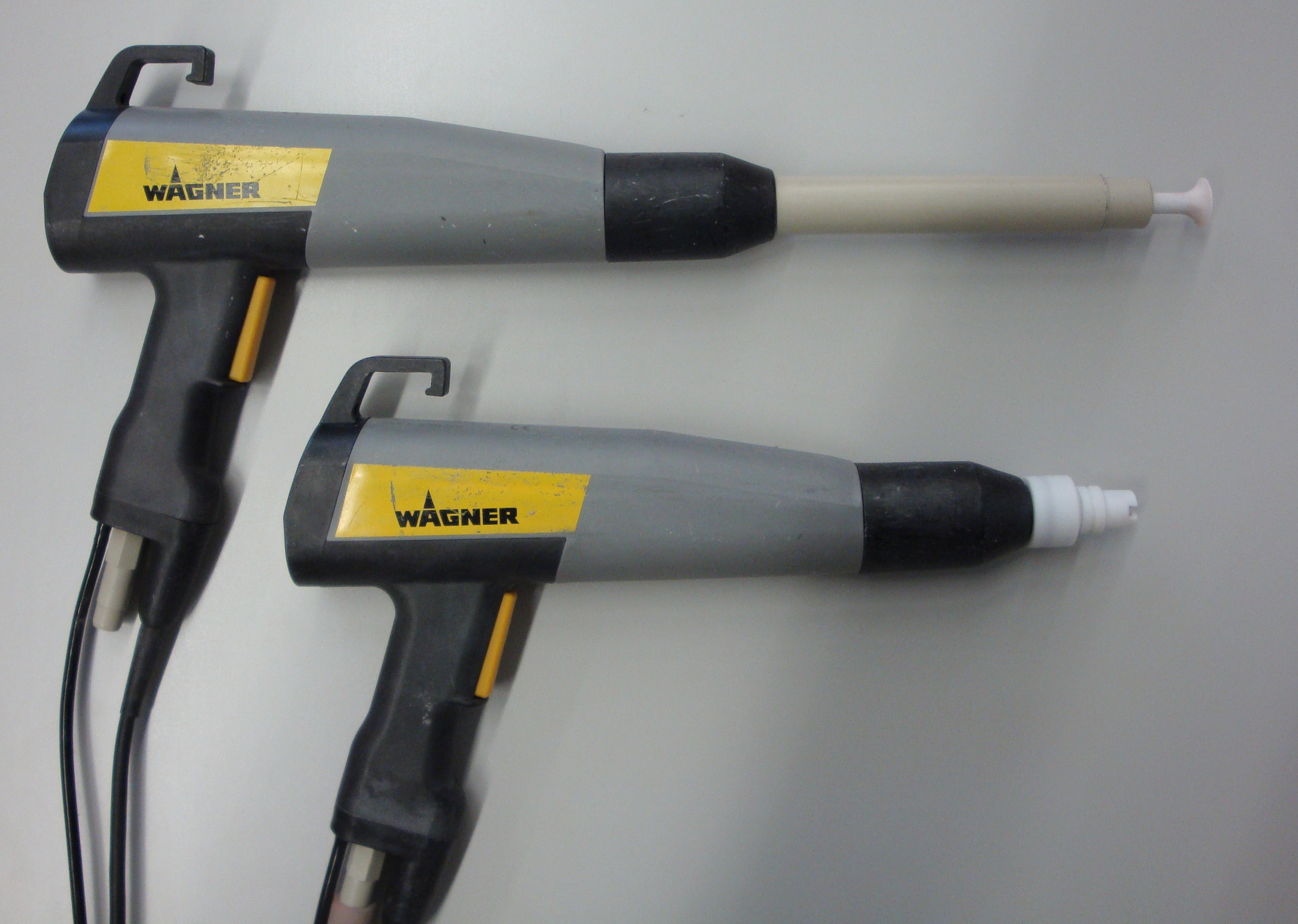
Example of powder coating spray guns

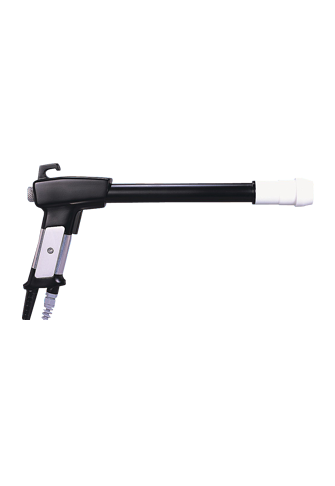
The Tribo powder coating gun, is the purest form of electro static powder charging. It charges the powder using friction, eliminating the issues caused by the Faraday’s cage effect occurs while spraying with Corona guns. Hence used to coat the most complex shapes perfectly.

The most common way of applying the powder coating to metal objects is to spray the powder using an electrostatic gun, or corona gun. The gun imparts a negative charge to the powder, which is then sprayed towards the grounded object by mechanical or compressed air spraying and then accelerated toward the workpiece by the powerful electrostatic charge. There is a wide variety of spray nozzles available for use in electrostatic coating. The type of nozzle used will depend on the shape of the workpiece to be painted and the consistency of the paint. The object is then heated, and the powder melts into a uniform film, and is then cooled to form a hard coating. It is also common to heat the metal first and then spray the powder onto the hot substrate. Preheating can help to achieve a more uniform finish but can also create other problems, such as runs caused by excess powder.

Another type of gun is called a tribo gun, which charges the powder by the triboelectric. In this case, the powder picks up a positive charge while rubbing along the wall of a Teflon tube inside the barrel of the gun. These charged powder particles then adhere to the grounded substrate. Using a tribo gun requires a different formulation of powder than the more common corona guns. Tribo guns are not subject to some of the problems associated with corona guns, however, such as back-ionization and the Faraday cage effect.

Powder can also be applied using specifically adapted electrostatic discs.

Another method of applying powder coating, named as the fluidized bed method, is by heating the substrate and then dipping it into an aerated, powder-filled bed. The powder sticks and melts to the hot object. Further heating is usually required to finish curing the coating. This method is generally used when the desired thickness of coating is to exceed 300 micrometres. This is how most dishwasher racks are coated.

=== Electrostatic fluidized bed coating ===
Electrostatic fluidized bed application uses the same fluidizing technique as the conventional fluidized bed dip process but with much more powder depth in the bed. An electrostatic charging medium is placed inside the bed so that the powder material becomes charged as the fluidizing air lifts it up. Charged particles of powder move upward and form a cloud of charged powder above the fluid bed. When a grounded part is passed through the charged cloud the particles will be attracted to its surface. The parts are not preheated as they are for the conventional fluidized bed dip process.

=== Electrostatic magnetic brush (EMB) coating ===
A coating method for flat materials that applies powder with a roller, enabling relatively high speeds and accurate layer thickness between 5 and 100 micrometres. The base for this process is conventional copier technology. It is currently in use in some coating applications and looks promising for commercial powder coating on flat substrates (steel, aluminium, MDF, paper, board) as well as in sheet to sheet and/or roll to roll processes. This process can potentially be integrated in an existing coating line.

=== Curing ===
==== Thermoset ====
When a thermosetting powder is exposed to elevated temperature, it begins to melt, flows out, and then chemically reacts to form a higher-molecular-weight polymer in a network-like structure. This cure process, called crosslinking, requires a certain temperature for a certain length of time in order to reach full cure and establish the full film properties for which the material was designed.

The architecture of the polyester resin and type of curing agent have a major impact on crosslinking.

Common powders cure at 200 °C (392 °F) object temperature for 10 minutes. In European and Asian markets, a curing schedule of 180 °C (356 °F) for 10 minutes has been the industrial standard for decades, but is nowadays shifting towards a temperature level of 160 °C (320 °F) at the same curing time. Advanced hybrid systems for indoor applications are established to cure at a temperature level of 125–130 °C (257–266 °F) preferably for applications on medium-density fiberboards (MDF); outdoor durable powders with triglycidyl isocyanurate (TGIC) as hardener can operate at a similar temperature level, whereas TGIC-free systems with β-hydroxy alkylamides as curing agents are limited to approx. 160 °C (320 °F).

The low-temperature bake approach results in energy savings, especially in cases where coating of massive parts are task of the coating operation. The total oven residence time needs to be only 18–19 min to completely cure the reactive powder at 180 °C (356 °F).

A major challenge for all low-temperature cures is to optimize simultaneously reactivity, flow-out (aspect of the powder film) and storage stability. Low-temperature-cure powders tend to have less color stability than their standard bake counterparts because they contain catalysts to augment accelerated cure. HAA polyesters tend to overbake yellow more than do TGIC polyesters.

The curing schedule may vary according to the manufacturer's specifications. The application of energy to the product to be cured can be accomplished by convection cure ovens, infrared cure ovens, or by laser curing process. The latter demonstrates significant reduction of curing time.

==== UV cure ====
Ultraviolet (UV)-cured powder coatings have been in commercial use since the 1990s and were initially developed to finish heat-sensitive medium density fiberboard (MDF) furniture components. This coating technology requires less heat energy and cures significantly faster than thermally-cured powder coatings. Typical oven dwell times for UV curable powder coatings are 1–2 minutes with temperatures of the coating reaching 110–130 °C. The use of UV LED curing systems, which are highly energy efficient and do not generate IR energy from the lamp head, make UV-cured powder coating even more desirable for finishing a variety of heat-sensitive materials and assemblies. An additional benefit for UV-cured powder coatings is that the total process cycle, application to cure, is faster than other coating methods.

== Removing powder coating ==
Methylene chloride and acetone are generally effective at removing powder coating. Most other organic solvents (thinners, etc.) are completely ineffective. Recently, the suspected human carcinogen methylene chloride is being replaced by benzyl alcohol with great success. Powder coating can also be removed with abrasive blasting. 98% sulfuric acid commercial grade also removes powder coating film. Certain low grade powder coats can be removed with steel wool, though this might be a more labor-intensive process than desired.

Powder coating can also be removed by a burning off process, in which parts are put into a large high-temperature oven with temperatures typically reaching an air temperature of 300–450 °C. The process takes about four hours and requires the parts to be cleaned completely and re-powder coated. Parts made with a thinner-gauge material need to be burned off at a lower temperature to prevent the material from warping.

== Market ==
According to a market report prepared in August 2016 by Grand View Research, Inc., the powder coating industry includes Teflon, anodizing and electro-plating. The global powder coatings market is expected to reach US$16.55 billion by 2024. Increasing use of powder coatings for aluminum extrusion used in windows, door frames, building facades, kitchen, bathroom and electrical fixtures will fuel industry expansion. Rising construction spending in various countries including China, the U.S., Mexico, Qatar, UAE, India, Vietnam, and Singapore will fuel growth over the forecast period. Increasing government support for eco-friendly and economical products will stimulate demand over the forecast period. General industries were the prominent application segment and accounted for 20.7% of the global volume in 2015. The global market is predicted to be 20 billion dollars by 2027.

Increasing demand for tractors in the U.S., Brazil, Japan, India, and China is expected to augment the use of powder coatings on account of its corrosion protection, excellent outdoor durability, and high-temperature performance. Moreover, growing usage in agricultural equipment, exercise equipment, file drawers, computer cabinets, laptop computers, cell phones, and electronic components will propel industry expansion.

== See also ==
- Fusion bonded epoxy coating
- Hammer paint
- Laser printer
- Phosphate conversion coating
- Powder coating on glass
