= Mixes =

Mixes may refer to:

- Mixe people, an ethnic group of Mexico
- a form of the word mix, see Mix (disambiguation)
- DJ mixes, a sequence of music tracks
- Mixes (Kylie Minogue album), the 1998 remix album by Australian singer-songwriter Kylie Minogue
- Mixes (Transvision Vamp album), 1992
- Mixes, a 2008 album by C418

== See also ==
- Mixis, a genus of orchids
