= MXD =

MXD, MxD, or mxd can refer to:

- Manufacturing times Digital, a digital manufacturing institute based in Chicago, Illinois, U.S., that is part of Manufacturing USA
- Modang language, a language spoken in East Kalimantan province, Indonesia, by ISO 639 code
- Batik Air Malaysia, a regional airline from Malaysia, by ICAO code
- Maximum latewood density, a facet of tree rings studied by dendroclimatology
- .mxd, a file format for map data supported by ArcMap
- Minoxidil, a medicine used to treat high blood pressure and hair loss, by Protein Data Bank ligand code
- Marion Downs Airport, an airport in Marion Downs Station, Queensland, Australia; see List of airports by IATA airport code: M

== See also ==
- Mixed (disambiguation)
