= MYX =

MYX could refer to:

- Myx, a television channel in the Philippines

- Myx (American TV channel), the sister channel

- Masaba language, a Bantu language spoken in Uganda (ISO 639 myx)
- Bursa Malaysia, a Malaysian stock exchange

== See also ==
- Mix (disambiguation)
