= Rushton turbine =

Rotating disc with perpendicular blades

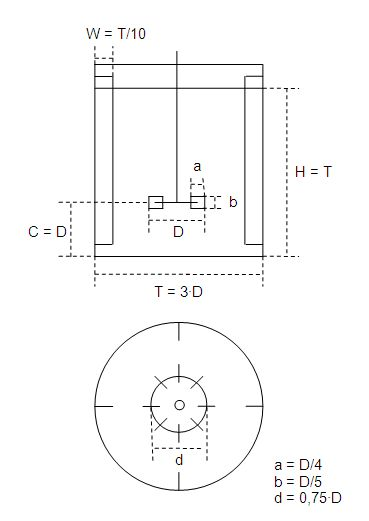
8-bladed Rushton Disc Turbine used as an impeller in a baffled process vessel

The Rushton turbine or Rushton disc turbine is a radial flow impeller used for many mixing applications (commonly for gas dispersion applications) in process engineering and was invented by John Henry Rushton. The design is based on a flat horizontal disk, with flat, vertically mounted blades that are usually six or eight in number. Recent innovations include the use of concave or semi-circular blades.

It is preferred in the fermentation and bioprocessing industries, because it can very efficiently facilitate gas dispersion, and it can create independent large-scale circulation loops for better homogenisation. This is because it can effectively handle non-Newtonian fluids, such as solid suspensions. In these cases, the diameter of the turbine is usually between a third to half of that of the cylindrical tank.
