= High-shear mixer =

Laboratory equipment

A high-shear mixer disperses, or transports, one phase or ingredient (liquid, solid, gas) into a main continuous phase (liquid), with which it would normally be immiscible. A rotor or impeller, together with a stationary component known as a stator, or an array of rotors and stators, is used either in a tank containing the solution to be mixed, or in a pipe through which the solution passes, to create shear. A high-shear mixer can be used to create emulsions, suspensions, lyosols (gas dispersed in liquid), and granular products. It is used in the adhesives, chemical, cosmetic, food, pharmaceutical, and plastics industries for emulsification, homogenization, particle size reduction, and dispersion.

== Principles of work ==
Fluid undergoes shear when one area of fluid travels with a different velocity relative to an adjacent area. A high-shear mixer uses a rotating impeller or high-speed rotor, or a series of such impellers or inline rotors, usually powered by an electric motor, to "work" the fluid, creating flow and shear. The tip velocity, or speed of the fluid at the outside diameter of the rotor, will be higher than the velocity at the center of the rotor, and it is this velocity difference that creates shear.

A stationary component may be used in combination with the rotor, and is referred to as the stator. The stator creates a close-clearance gap between the rotor and itself and forms an extremely high-shear zone for the material as it exits the rotor. The rotor and stator combined are often referred to as the mixing head, or generator. A large high-shear rotor–stator mixer may contain a number of generators.

Key design factors include the diameter of the rotor and its rotational speed, the distance between the rotor and the stator, the time in the mixer, and the number of generators in the series. Variables include the number of rows of teeth, their angle, and the width of the openings between teeth.

=== Batch high-shear mixers ===
In a batch high-shear mixer, the components to be mixed (whether immiscible liquids or powder in liquid) are fed from the top into a mixing tank containing the mixer on a rotating shaft at the bottom of the tank. A batch high-shear mixer can process a given volume of material approximately twice as fast as an inline rotor–stator mixer of the same power rating; such mixers continue to be used where faster processing by volume is the major requirement, and space is not limited. When mixing sticky solutions, some of the product may be left in the tank, necessitating cleaning. However, there are designs of batch high-shear mixers that clean the tank as part of the operating run. Some high-shear mixers are designed to run dry, limiting the amount of cleaning needed in the tank.

=== Inline high-shear mixers ===
In an inline high-shear rotor–stator mixer, the rotor–stator array is contained in a housing with an inlet at one end and an outlet at the other, and the rotor driven through a seal. The components to be mixed are drawn through the generator array in a continuous stream, with the whole acting as a centrifugal pumping device. Inline high-shear mixers offer a more controlled mixing environment, take up less space, and can be used as part of a continuous process. Equilibrium mixing can be achieved by passing the product through the inline high-shear mixer more than once

=== Inline powder induction ===
An inline rotor–stator mixer equipped for powder induction offers flexibility, capability, and portability to serve multiple mix vessels of virtually any size. Its straightforward operation and convenience further maximize equipment utility while simplifying material handling.

When used with a vacuum pump and hopper, an inline shear mixer can be a very effective way to incorporate powders into liquid streams. Otherwise known as high-shear powder inductors, these systems have the advantage of keeping the process on the floor level instead of working with heavy bags on mezzanines. High-shear powder induction systems also offer easy interchangeability with multiple tanks.

High-shear powder induction can offer additional benefits over conventional mixing methods, particularly when processing ingredients prone to forming agglomerates. In some applications, switching from low-shear agitation to high-shear powder/liquid mixing has resulted in faster hydration, lower ingredient waste, and reduced need for heating or post-filtration steps.

=== High-shear granulators ===
A high-shear granulator is a process array consisting of an inline or batch high-shear mixer and a fluid-bed dryer. In a granulation process, only the solid component of the mixture is required. Fluid is used only as an aid to processing. The high-shear mixer processes the solid material down to the desired particle size, and the mixture is then pumped to the drying bed where the fluid is removed, leaving behind the granular product.

=== Ultra-high-shear inline mixers ===
In an ultra-high-shear inline mixer, the high-shear mixing takes place in a single or multiple passes through a rotor–stator array. The mixer is designed to subject the product to higher shear and a larger number of shearing events than a standard inline rotor–stator mixer, producing an exceptionally narrow particle-size distribution. Sub-micrometre particle sizes are possible using the ultra-high-shear technology. To achieve this, the machine is equipped with stators with precision-machined holes or slots through which the product is forced by the rotors. The rotor–stator array can also include a mechanism whereby the momentum of the flow is changed (for example by forcing it sideways through the stator), allowing for more processing in a single pass.

== Equilibrium mixing ==
High-shear mixers are used in industry to produce standard mixtures of ingredients that do not naturally mix. When the total fluid is composed of two or more liquids, the final result is an emulsion; when composed of a solid and a liquid, it is termed a suspension and when a gas is dispersed throughout a liquid, the result is a lyosol. Each class may or may not be homogenized, depending on the amount of input energy.

To achieve a standard mix, the technique of equilibrium mixing is used. A target characteristic is identified, such that once the mixed product has acquired that characteristic, it will not change significantly thereafter, no matter how long the product is processed. For dispersions, this is the equilibrium particle size. For emulsions, it is the equilibrium droplet size. The amount of mixing required to achieve equilibrium mixing is measured in tank turnover – the number of times the volume of material must pass through the high-shear zone.

== Uses of high-shear mixing technology ==
High-shear mixers are used at throughout the chemical process industries, wherever it is necessary to produce standardized mixtures of ingredients that do not naturally mix. These include:

- Pharmaceuticals, preparations of suspensions and granular products
- Paper manufacture, bleaching and preparation of paper pulp
- Food preparation, emulsions for condiments, sauces and dressings
- Manufacture of cosmetics and toiletries
- Paint manufacturing, to disperse pigment into a resin and solvent mix, generally used in car paint along with industrial coatings, including aircraft, packaging and commercial transport vehicles.

== See also ==
- High viscosity mixer
