= Mixture (disambiguation) =

A mixture is a combination of two or more chemicals, in which the chemicals retain their identity.

Mixture may also refer to:

- Mixture (probability), a set of probability distributions often used for statistical classification
- Mixture (organ stop), a special kind of pipe organ stop which has several pipes to each note
- Bombay mix, called "mixture" in southern India
- The Mixtures, an Australian rock band formed in 1965

== See also ==
- Mixtur, a 1964 composition by Karlheinz Stockhausen
- Mix (disambiguation)
