= Mixe =

Mixe may refer to:

- Mixe people, an ethnic group of Oaxaca, Mexica
- Mixe languages, the group of languages spoken by them
- Sierra Mixe, a district in Oaxaca, Mexico
- Roman Catholic Territorial Prelature of Mixes, in Oaxaca, Mexico
- Lit-et-Mixe, a commune in Nouvelle-Aquitaine
- Mix Country, a historic region of the French Basque Country, which includes the present-day communes of Aïcirits-Camou-Suhast and Uhart-Mixe

== See also ==
- Mis (disambiguation)
