= Mixed =

Mixed is the past tense of mix.

Mixed may refer to:

- Mixed (United Kingdom ethnicity category), an ethnicity category that has been used by the United Kingdom's Office for National Statistics since the 2001 Census

== Music ==
- Mixed (album), a compilation album of two avant-garde jazz sessions featuring performances by the Cecil Taylor Unit and the Roswell Rudd Sextet

== See also ==
- Mix (disambiguation)
- Mixed breed, an animal whose family are from different breeds or species
- Mixed ethnicity, a person who is of multiracial descent
