= In the Mix =

In the Mix may refer to:

- In the Mix (film), a film starring Usher
- In the Mix (TV series), an American program for teenagers
- The Best of 10 Years – 32 Superhits, a 1986 album by Boney M. re-released in 2008 as In the Mix
- In the Mix (album), a 1994 album by pianist John Hicks, or the title track
- "In the Mix" (Mariah Carey song), the theme song of the American sitcom Mixed-ish

== See also ==
- B in the Mix: The Remixes, an album by Britney Spears
- In da Mix, a 1999 album by Blank & Jones
- In de mix, a Belgian Flemish music television series
