= The Mix (Tacoma, Washington) =

Gay bar in Tacoma, Washington, U.S.

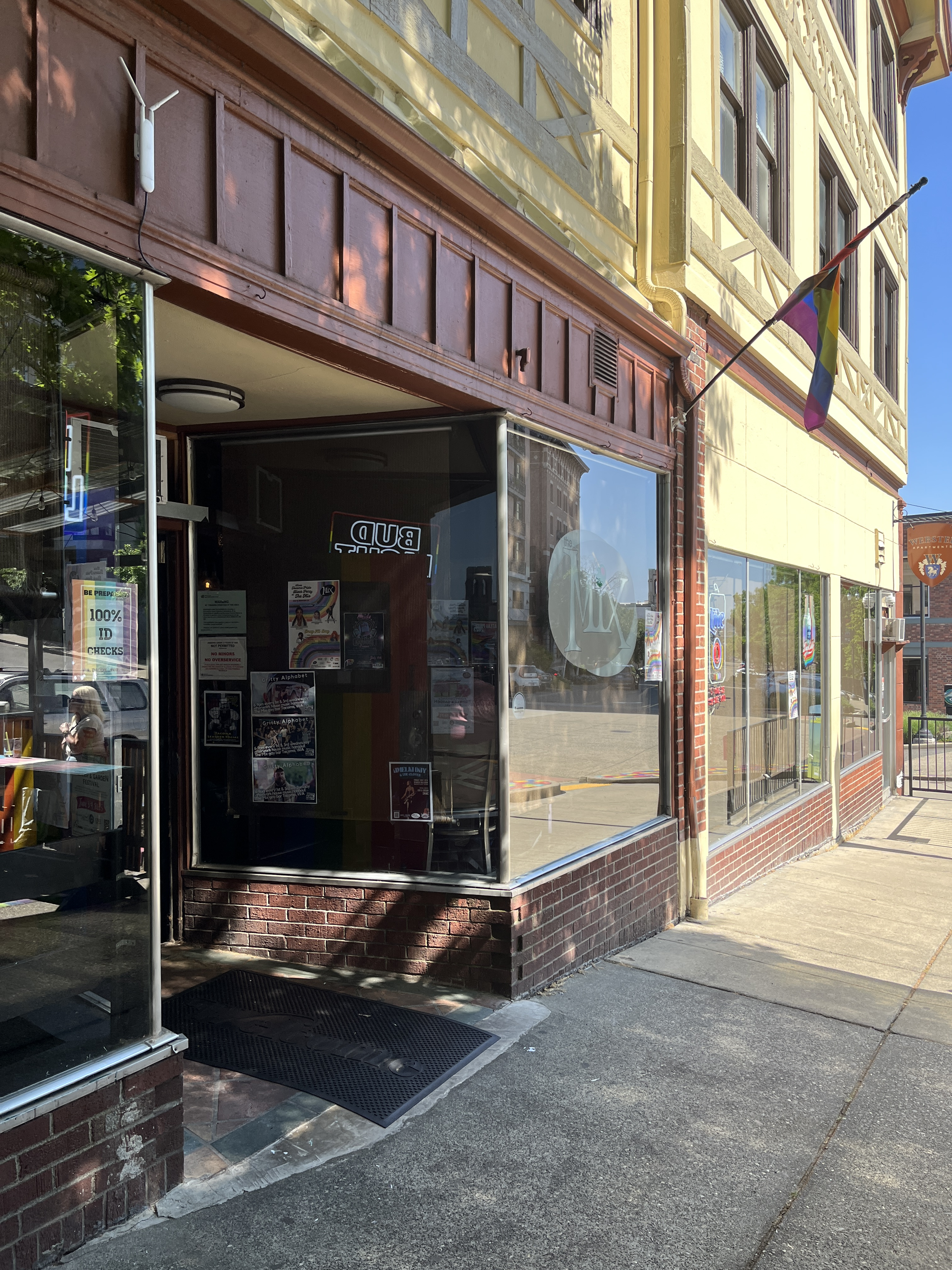
- The bar's exterior in 2023
- Interactive map of The Mix

Restaurant information
- Owners: Matt Henderson; Brock Leach; Travis Scheff
- Location: 635 St. Helens Avenue, Tacoma, Washington, 98402, United States
- Coordinates: 47°15′28″N 122°26′33″W
- Website: themixtacoma.com

The Mix is a gay bar in Tacoma, Washington, in the United States.

== Description ==
The Mix is an LGBTQ-friendly bar in on St. Helens Avenue in Tacoma, Washington. The bar hosts dancing, drag shows and karaoke regularly; SouthSound Talk says, "Every night from 9:00 p.m. to 1:30 a.m. The Mix packs with men and women eager to take the bar's tiny stage. Enjoy a round of pool while you wait for your turn on the mic."

== History ==
Co-owners have included Matt Henderson, Brock Leach, and Travis Scheff.

The bar hosts an annual block party in conjunction with Pride festivities. In 2020, during the COVID-19 pandemic, The Mix hosted a virtual drag show.

== Reception ==
Chelsea Hawkins of MyNorthwest.com has called The Mix an "important fixture". In a 2013 "queer girl" guide of Tacoma, Autostraddle said of the bar:

Relaxed and friendly, you'll feel right at home here. There's karaoke, but when that's not happening they tend to play pretty decent music. Like Silverstone, The Mix is a queer grab bag: on any given night you can booze alongside drag queens, baby boomers, femmes, butches, leather daddies… you name it. The Mix may not be the most, um, glamorous place you've ever been drunk at, but the bartenders are nice and the crowd is kind of hilarious.

According to SouthSound Talk, The Mix was named Western Washington's best gay and lesbian bar in 2014. The Advocate said The Mix was "the go-to neighborhood bar" in 2015.
