= Turbomixer =

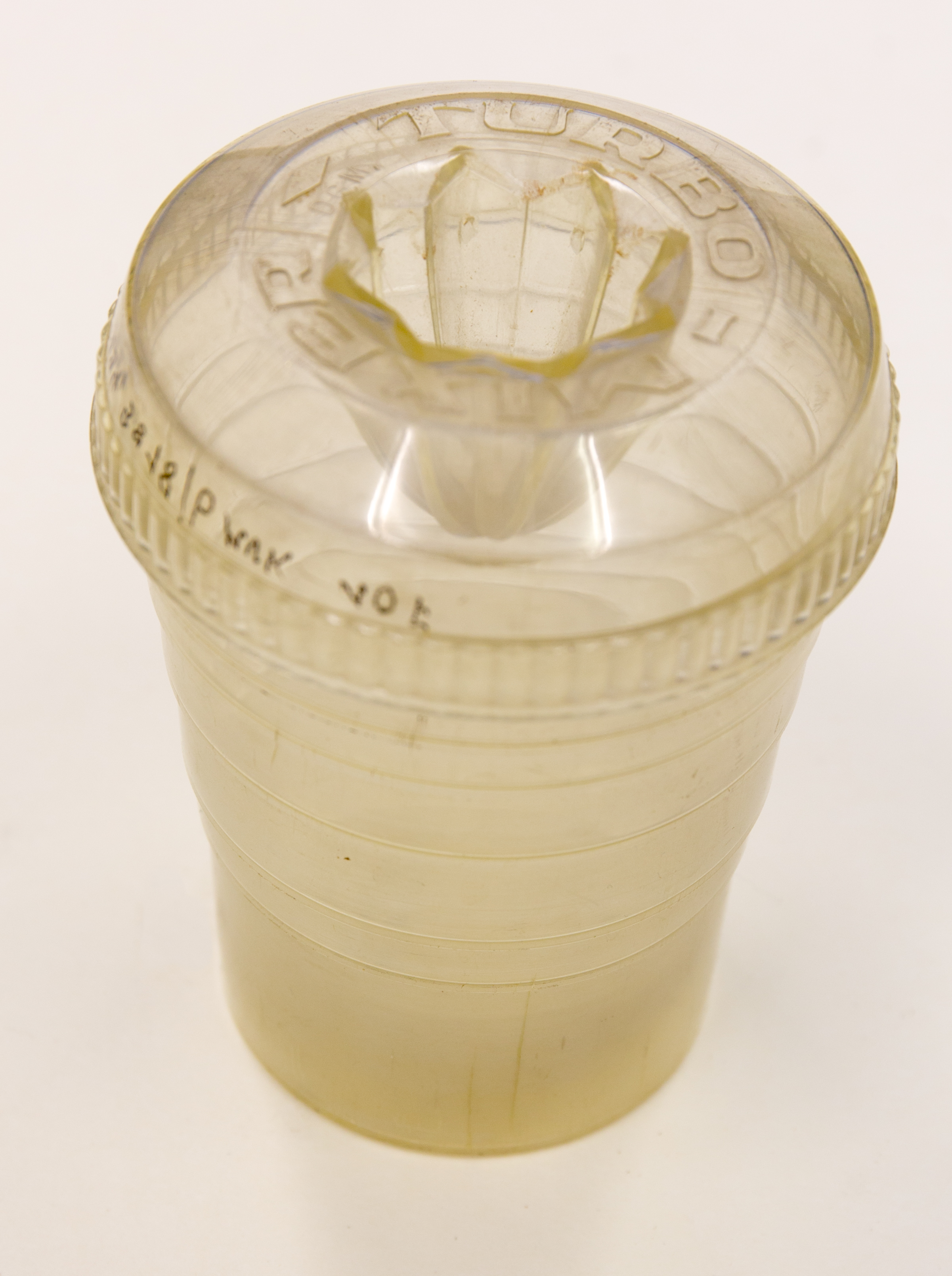
Turbo mixer owned by the Museum Europäischer Kulturen

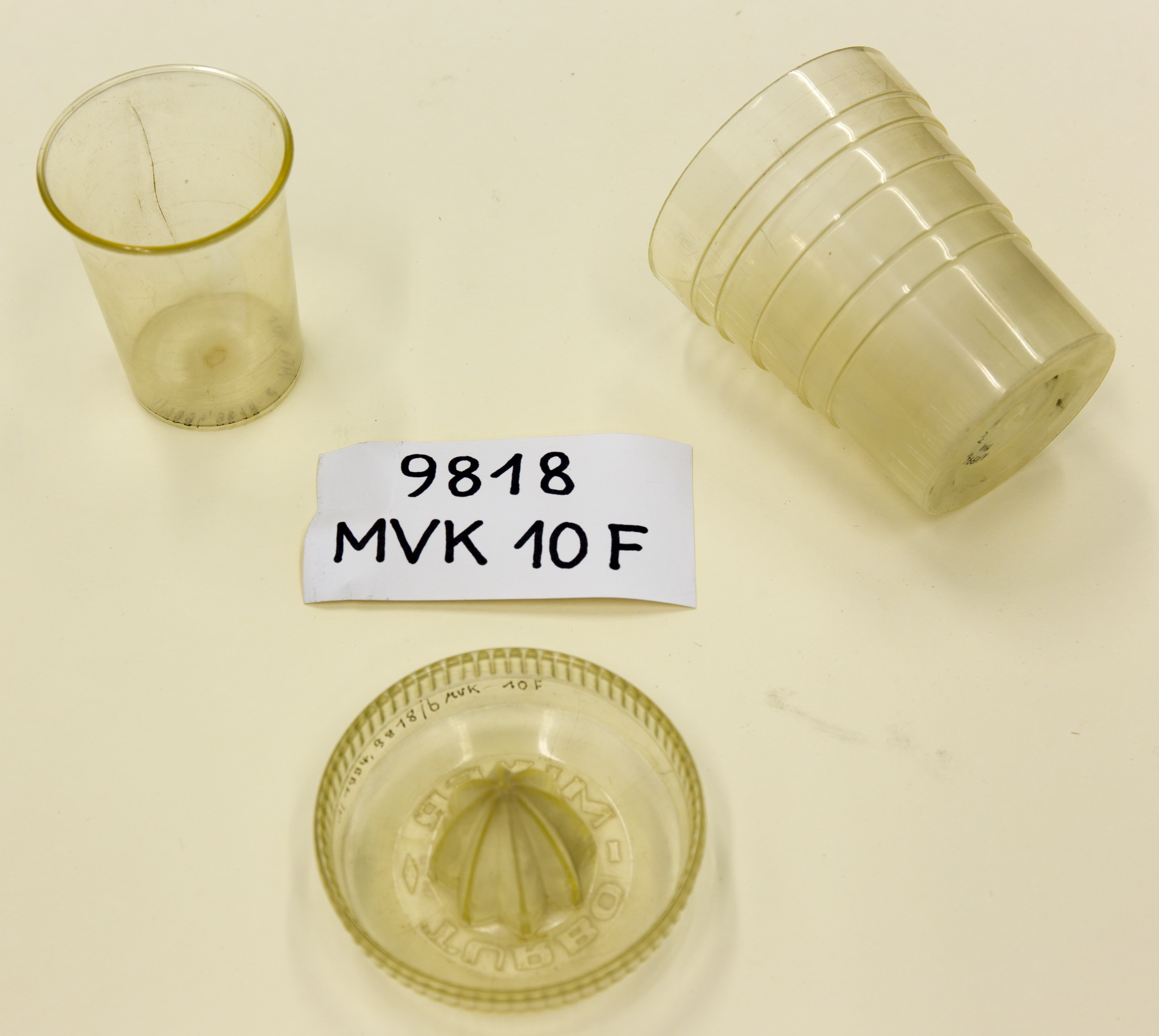
parts of the Turbo mixer

A Turbo mixer, also known as a high speed mixer or a tank mixer, is a type of industrial mixer that uses PVC for mixing raw materials to form a free-flowing powder blend.

== Design ==
It includes a cylindrical tank with a mixing tool assembled on the bottom that typically operates at a peripheral speed of between 20 and 50 m/s, depending on the material to blend. The material is heated inside by a mixer, through the mechanical energy that is produced between the mixing tools and the material which generates mutual impacts of the particles. During the mixing phase, the Turbo-mixer creates an axial vortex. The structure and position of the blades inside the mixer guarantee homogeneous material dispersion.

To avoid thermal degradation, it is usually combined with a cooler that cools down the dry blend to the temperature of around 45-55 C. Due to the poor heat conductivity of the cooler, the cooler is usually three times larger than the mixer as the cooling time is proportional to contact surface.

== Applications ==
The typical uses of the Turbo mixer is for the production of PVC (dry-blend rigid or plasticized) and for other kinds of thermoplastic composites (like Master-Batch, Wood Plastic Composites, Additives, Thermoplastics Polymers). The largest high-speed mixer known on the market has a tank volume of 2500 litres, which corresponds to a PVC batch size of about 1160 kg and is combined with a horizontal cooler 8600 L. This machine, due to the kind of products was mixed, they have also an introduction of around 500 kg into the cooler mixer, and they can produce around 14 Ton/hour It was manufactured by the Italian company PROMIXON S.r.L. in 2014.
