= Mix (surname) =

Mix is a surname. Notable people with the surname include:

- Art Mix (1896 – 1972), American character actor
- Bryant Mix (born 1972), American football player
- Charles Eli Mix (1810–1878), American civil servant
- E. Townsend Mix (1831–1890), American architect
- Erich Mix (1898–1971), German politician
- Ron Mix (born 1938), American All-Pro Hall of Fame football player
- Ruth Mix (1912–1977), American B-movie actress; daughter of Tom Mix (see below)
- Steve Mix (born 1947), American usher and former National Basketball Association player and women's collegiate basketball coach
- Tom Mix (1880–1940), American film actor
- Walter Mix (1917–2004), highly decorated German World War II officer
