= High viscosity mixer =

High viscosity mixers are mixers designed for mixing materials with laminar mixing processes because the ingredients have such high viscosities that a turbulent mixing phase cannot be obtained at all or cannot be obtained without a high amount of heat. The process can be used for high viscosity liquid to liquid mixing or for paste mixing combining liquid and solid ingredients. Some products that may require laminar mixing in a high viscosity mixer include putties, chewing gum, and soaps. The end product usually starts at several hundred thousand centipoise and can reach as high as several million centipoise.

Typical mixers used for this purpose are of the Double Arm, Double Planetary or Planetary Disperser design. Models are built to include many features such as vacuum and jacketing to remove air and to control the temperature of the mixture. Capacities are available from 1/2 pint to several thousand gallons.

== See also ==
- Mixing (process engineering)
- High-shear mixer
