= Mixing (process engineering) =

Process of mechanically stirring a heterogeneous mixture to homogenize it

In industrial process engineering, mixing is a unit operation that involves manipulation of a heterogeneous physical system with the intent to make it more homogeneous. Familiar examples include pumping of the water in a swimming pool to homogenize the water temperature, and the stirring of pancake batter to eliminate lumps (deagglomeration).

Mixing is performed to allow transfer of heat or mass, or both, to occur between one or more streams, components or phases. Modern industrial processing almost always involves some form of mixing. Some classes of chemical reactors are also mixers.

With the right equipment, it is possible to mix a solid, liquid or gas into another solid, liquid or gas. A biofuel fermenter may require the mixing of microbes, gases and liquid medium for optimal yield; organic nitration requires concentrated (liquid) nitric and sulfuric acids to be mixed with a hydrophobic organic phase; production of pharmaceutical tablets requires blending of solid powders.

The opposite of mixing is segregation. A classical example of segregation is the brazil nut effect.

Schematics of an agitated vessel with a Rushton turbine and baffles

The mathematics of mixing is highly abstract, and is a part of ergodic theory, itself a part of chaos theory.

== Mixing classification ==
The type of operation and equipment used during mixing depends on the state of materials being mixed (liquid, semi-solid, or solid) and the miscibility of the materials being processed. In this context, the act of mixing may be synonymous with stirring-, or kneading-processes.

== Liquid–liquid mixing ==
Mixing of liquids occurs frequently in process engineering. The nature of liquids to blend determines the equipment used. Single-phase blending tends to involve low-shear, high-flow mixers to cause liquid engulfment, while multi-phase mixing generally requires the use of high-shear, low-flow mixers to create droplets of one liquid in laminar, turbulent or transitional flow regimes, depending on the Reynolds number of the flow. Turbulent or transitional mixing is frequently conducted with turbines or impellers; laminar mixing is conducted with helical ribbon or anchor mixers.

=== Single-phase blending ===
Mixing of liquids that are miscible or at least soluble in each other occurs frequently in engineering (and in everyday life). An everyday example would be the addition of milk or cream to tea or coffee. Since both liquids are water-based, they dissolve easily in one another. The momentum of the liquid being added is sometimes enough to cause enough turbulence to mix the two, since the viscosity of both liquids is relatively low. If necessary, a spoon or paddle could be used to complete the mixing process. Blending in a more viscous liquid, such as honey, requires more mixing power per unit volume to achieve the same homogeneity in the same amount of time.

== Solid–solid mixing ==
Dry blenders are a type of industrial mixer which are typically used to blend multiple dry components until they are homogeneous. Often minor liquid additions are made to the dry blend to modify the product formulation. Blending times using dry ingredients are often short (15–30 minutes) but are somewhat dependent upon the varying percentages of each component, and the difference in the bulk densities of each. Ribbon, paddle, tumble and vertical blenders are available. Many products including pharmaceuticals, foods, chemicals, fertilizers, plastics, pigments, and cosmetics are manufactured in these designs. Dry blenders range in capacity from half-cubic-foot laboratory models to 500-cubic-foot production units. A wide variety of horsepower-and-speed combinations and optional features such as sanitary finishes, vacuum construction, special valves and cover openings are offered by most manufacturers.

Blending powders is one of the oldest unit-operations in the solids handling industries. For many decades powder blending has been used just to homogenize bulk materials. Many different machines have been designed to handle materials with various bulk solids properties. On the basis of the practical experience gained with these different machines, engineering knowledge has been developed to construct reliable equipment and to predict scale-up and mixing behavior. Nowadays the same mixing technologies are used for many more applications: to improve product quality, to coat particles, to fuse materials, to wet, to disperse in liquid, to agglomerate, to alter functional material properties, etc. This wide range of applications of mixing equipment requires a high level of knowledge, long time experience and extended test facilities to come to the optimal selection of equipment and processes.

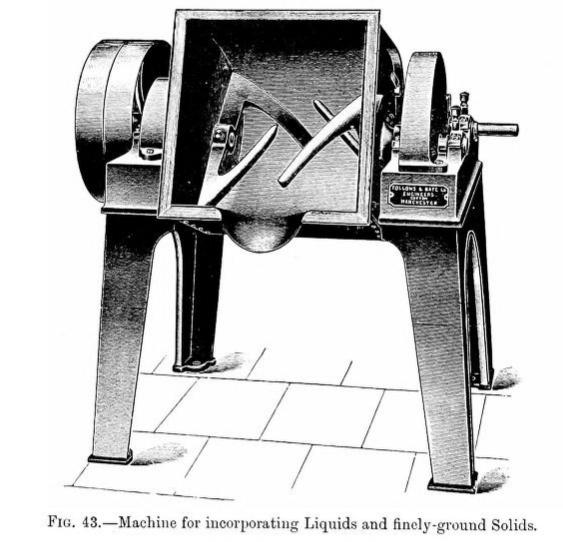
Machine for incorporating liquids and finely ground solids

Solid-solid mixing can be performed either in batch mixers, which is the simpler form of mixing, or in certain cases in continuous dry-mix, more complex but which provide interesting advantages in terms of segregation, capacity and validation. One example of a solid–solid mixing process is mulling foundry molding sand, where sand, bentonite clay, fine coal dust and water are mixed to a plastic, moldable and reusable mass. This is used for molding and pouring molten metal to obtain sand castings to make metallic parts for automobiles, machine building, construction or other industries.

=== Mixing mechanisms ===
In powder two different dimensions in the mixing process can be determined: convective mixing and intensive mixing. In the case of convective mixing material in the mixer is transported from one location to another. This type of mixing leads to a less ordered state inside the mixer, the components that must be mixed are distributed over the other components. With progressing time the mixture becomes more randomly ordered. After a certain mixing time the ultimate random state is reached. Usually this type of mixing is applied for free-flowing and coarse materials.

Possible threats during macro mixing is the de-mixing of the components, since differences in size, shape or density of the different particles can lead to segregation.

When materials are cohesive, which is the case with e.g. fine particles and also with wet material, convective mixing is no longer sufficient to obtain a randomly ordered mixture. The relative strong inter-particle forces form lumps, which are not broken up by the mild transportation forces in the convective mixer. To decrease the lump size additional forces are necessary; i.e. more energy intensive mixing is required. These additional forces can either be impact forces or shear forces.

== Liquid–solid mixing ==
Liquid–solid mixing is typically done to suspend coarse free-flowing solids, or to break up lumps of fine agglomerated solids. An example of the former is the mixing granulated sugar into water; an example of the latter is the mixing of flour or powdered milk into water. In the first case, the particles can be lifted into suspension (and separated from one another) by bulk motion of the fluid; in the second, the mixer itself (or the high shear field near it) must destabilize the lumps and cause them to disintegrate.

One example of a solid–liquid mixing process in industry is concrete mixing, where cement, sand, small stones or gravel and water are commingled to a homogeneous self-hardening mass, used in the construction industry.

=== Solid suspension ===
Suspension of solids into a liquid is done to improve the rate of mass transfer between the solid and the liquid. Examples include dissolving a solid reactant into a solvent, or suspending catalyst particles in liquid to improve the flow of reactants and products to and from the particles. The associated eddy diffusion increases the rate of mass transfer within the bulk of the fluid, and the convection of material away from the particles decreases the size of the boundary layer, where most of the resistance to mass transfer occurs. Axial-flow impellers are preferred for solid suspension because solid suspension needs momentum rather than shear, although radial-flow impellers can be used in a tank with baffles, which converts some of the rotational motion into vertical motion. When the solid is denser than the liquid (and therefore collects at the bottom of the tank), the impeller is rotated so that the fluid is pushed downwards; when the solid is less dense than the liquid (and therefore floats on top), the impeller is rotated so that the fluid is pushed upwards (though this is relatively rare). The equipment preferred for solid suspension produces large volumetric flows but not necessarily high shear; high flow-number turbine impellers, such as hydrofoils, are typically used. Multiple turbines mounted on the same shaft can reduce power draw.

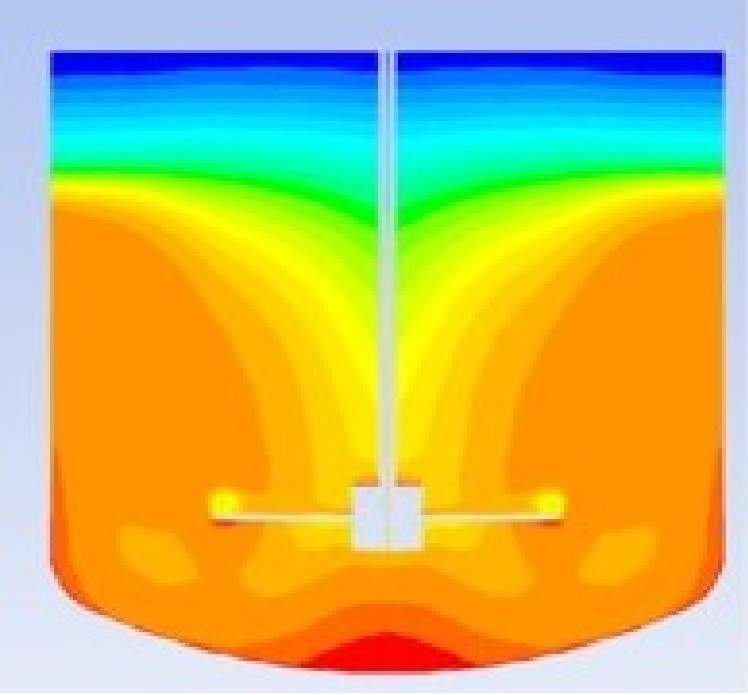
Solid volume fraction in a mixing tank

The degree of homogeneity of a solid-liquid suspension can be described by the RSD (Relative Standard Deviation of the solid volume fraction field in the mixing tank). A perfect suspension would have a RSD of 0% but in practice, a RSD inferior or equal to 20% can be sufficient for the suspension to be considered homogeneous, although this is case-dependent. The RSD can be obtained by experimental measurements or by calculations. Measurements can be performed at full scale but this is generally unpractical, so it is common to perform measurements at small scale and use a "scale-up" criterion to extrapolate the RSD from small to full scale. Calculations can be performed using a computational fluid dynamics software or by using correlations built on theoretical developments, experimental measurements and/or computational fluid dynamics data. Computational fluid dynamics calculations are quite accurate and can accommodate virtually any tank and agitator designs, but they require expertise and long computation time. Correlations are easy to use but are less accurate and don't cover any possible designs. The most popular correlation is the ‘just suspended speed’ correlation published by Zwietering (1958). It's an easy-to-use correlation but it is not meant for homogeneous suspension. It only provides a crude estimate of the stirring speed for ‘bad’ quality suspensions (partial suspensions) where no particle remains at the bottom for more than 1 or 2 seconds. Another equivalent correlation is the correlation from Mersmann (1998). For ‘good’ quality suspensions, some examples of useful correlations can be found in the publications of Barresi (1987), Magelli (1991), Cekinski (2010) or Macqueron (2017). Machine learning can also be used to build models way more accurate than "classical" correlations.

=== Solid deagglomeration ===
Very fine powders, such as titanium dioxide pigments, and materials that have been spray dried may agglomerate or form lumps during transportation and storage. Starchy materials or those that form gels when exposed to solvent can form lumps that are wetted on the outside but dry on the inside. These types of materials are not easily mixed into liquid with the types of mixers preferred for solid suspension because the agglomerate particles must be subjected to intense shear to be broken up. In some ways, deagglomeration of solids is similar to the blending of immiscible liquids, except for the fact that coalescence is usually not a problem. An everyday example of this type of mixing is the production of milkshakes from liquid milk and solid ice cream.

== Liquid–gas mixing ==
Liquids and gases are typically mixed to allow mass transfer to occur. For instance, in the case of air stripping, gas is used to remove volatiles from a liquid. Typically, a packed column is used for this purpose, with the packing acting as a motionless mixer and the air pump providing the driving force. When a tank and impeller are used, the objective is typically to ensure that the gas bubbles remain in contact with the liquid for as long as possible. This is especially important if the gas is expensive, such as pure oxygen, or diffuses slowly into the liquid. Mixing in a tank is also useful when a (relatively) slow chemical reaction is occurring in the liquid phase, and so the concentration difference in the thin layer near the bubble is close to that of the bulk. This reduces the driving force for mass transfer. If there is a (relatively) fast chemical reaction in the liquid phase, it is sometimes advantageous to disperse but not recirculate the gas bubbles, ensuring that they are in plug flow and can transfer mass more efficiently.

Rushton turbines have been traditionally used to disperse gases into liquids, but newer options, such as the Smith turbine and Bakker turbine are becoming more prevalent. One of the issues is that as the gas flow increases, more and more of the gas accumulates in the low pressure zones behind the impeller blades, which reduces the power drawn by the mixer (and therefore its effectiveness). Newer designs, such as the GDX impeller, have nearly eliminated this problem.

== Gas–solid mixing ==
Gas–solid mixing may be conducted to transport powders or small particulate solids from one place to another, or to mix gaseous reactants with solid catalyst particles. In either case, the turbulent eddies of the gas must provide enough force to suspend the solid particles, which otherwise sink under the force of gravity. The size and shape of the particles is an important consideration, since different particles have different drag coefficients, and particles made of different materials have different densities. A common unit operation the process industry uses to separate gases and solids is the cyclone, which slows the gas and causes the particles to settle out.

== Multiphase mixing ==
Multiphase mixing occurs when solids, liquids and gases are combined in one step. This may occur as part of a catalytic chemical process, in which liquid and gaseous reagents must be combined with a solid catalyst (such as hydrogenation); or in fermentation, where solid microbes and the gases they require must be well-distributed in a liquid medium. The type of mixer used depends upon the properties of the phases. In some cases, the mixing power is provided by the gas itself as it moves up through the liquid, entraining liquid with the bubble plume. This draws liquid upwards inside the plume, and causes liquid to fall outside the plume. If the viscosity of the liquid is too high to allow for this (or if the solid particles are too heavy), an impeller may be needed to keep the solid particles suspended.

Schematic drawing of a fluidized bed reactor

== Basic nomenclature ==
For liquid mixing, the nomenclature is rather standardized:

- Impeller Diameter, "D" is measured for industrial mixers as the maximum diameter swept around the axis of rotation.
- Rotational Speed, "N" is usually measured in revolutions per minute (RPM) or revolutions per second (RPS). This variable refers to the rotational speed of the impeller as this number can differ along points of the drive train.
- Tank Diameter, "T" The inside diameter of a cylindrical vessel. Most mixing vessels receiving industrial mixers will be cylindrical.
- Power, "P" Is the energy input into a system usually by an electric motor or a pneumatic motor
- Impeller Pumping Capacity, "Q" The resulting fluid motion from impeller rotation.

== Constitutive equations ==
Many of the equations used for determining the output of mixers are empirically derived, or contain empirically derived constants. Since mixers operate in the turbulent regime, many of the equations are approximations that are considered acceptable for most engineering purposes.

When a mixing impeller rotates in the fluid, it generates a combination of flow and shear. The impeller generated flow can be calculated with the following equation:

$Q = Fl*N*D^3$

Flow numbers for impellers have been published in the North American Mixing Forum sponsored Handbook of Industrial Mixing.

The power required to rotate an impeller can be calculated using the following equations:

$P= P_{o}\rho N^3D^5$ (Turbulent regime)

$P= K_p\mu N^2D^3$ (Laminar regime)

$P_{o}$ is the (dimensionless) power number, which is a function of impeller geometry; $\rho$ is the density of the fluid; $N$ is the rotational speed, typically rotations per second; $D$ is the diameter of the impeller; $K_p$ is the laminar power constant; and $\mu$ is the viscosity of the fluid. Note that the mixer power is strongly dependent upon the rotational speed and impeller diameter, and linearly dependent upon either the density or viscosity of the fluid, depending on which flow regime is present. In the transitional regime, flow near the impeller is turbulent and so the turbulent power equation is used.

The time required to blend a fluid to within 5% of the final concentration, ${\theta_{95}}$, can be calculated with the following correlations:

${\theta_{95}} = \frac {5.40} {P_{o}^{1 \over 3} N} (\frac {T} {D})^2$ (Turbulent regime)

${\theta_{95}} = \frac {34596} {P_{o}{1 \over 3} N^2 D^2} (\frac {\mu} {\rho}) (\frac {T} {D})^2$ (Transitional region)

${\theta_{95}} = \frac {896*10^3 K_p^{-1.69}} {N}$ (Laminar regime)

The Transitional/Turbulent boundary occurs at $P_{o}^{1 \over 3} Re = 6404$

The Laminar/Transitional boundary occurs at $P_{o}^{1 \over 3} Re = 186$

== Laboratory mixing ==
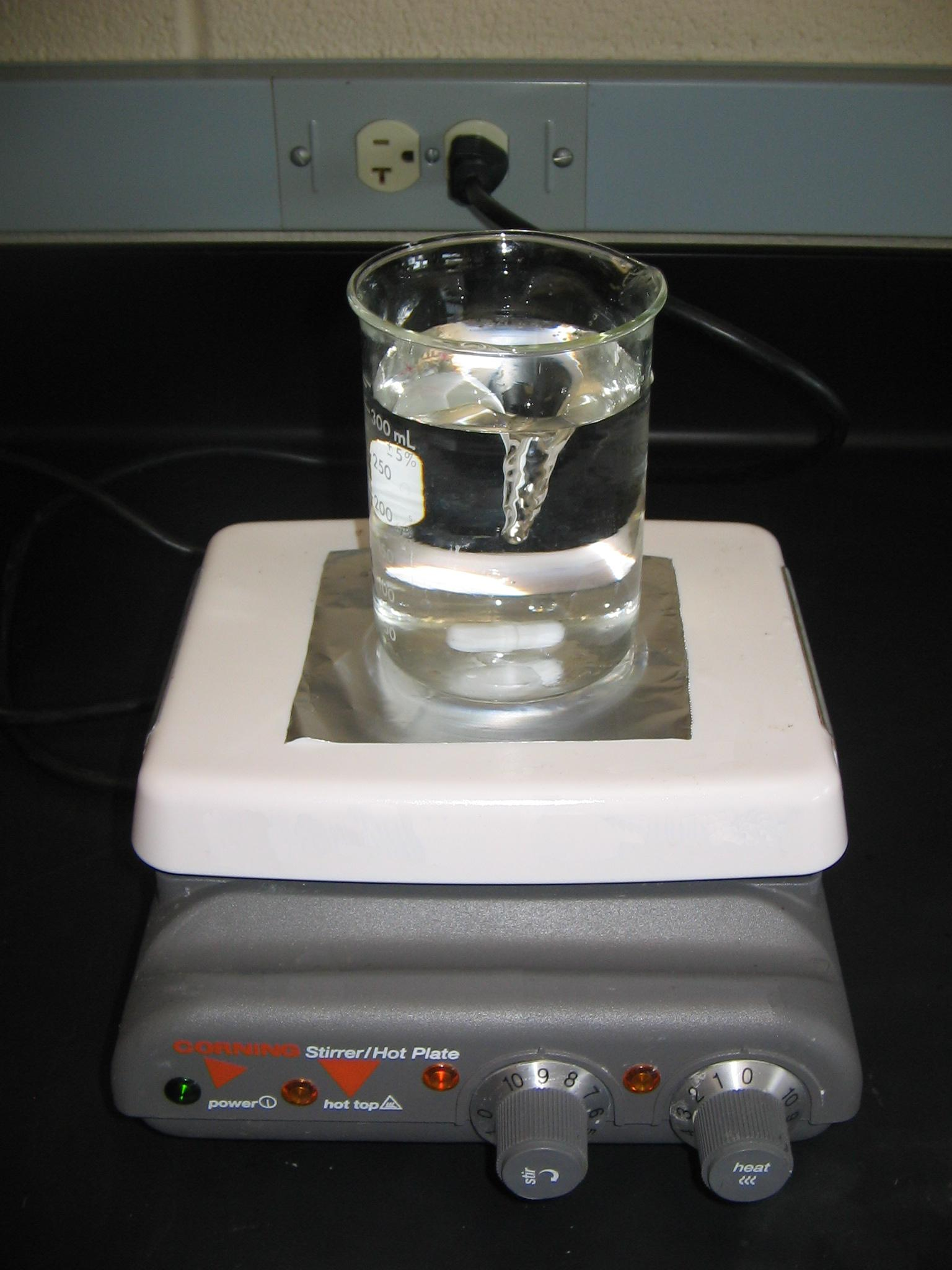
A magnetic stirrer

At a laboratory scale, mixing is achieved by magnetic stirrers or by simple hand-shaking. Sometimes mixing in laboratory vessels is more thorough and occurs faster than is possible industrially. Magnetic stir bars are radial-flow mixers that induce solid body rotation in the fluid being mixed. This is acceptable on a small scale, since the vessels are small and mixing therefore occurs rapidly (short blend time). A variety of stir bar configurations exist, but because of the small size and (typically) low viscosity of the fluid, it is possible to use one configuration for nearly all mixing tasks. The cylindrical stir bar can be used for suspension of solids, as seen in iodometry, deagglomeration (useful for preparation of microbiology growth medium from powders), and liquid–liquid blending. Another peculiarity of laboratory mixing is that the mixer rests on the bottom of the vessel instead of being suspended near the center. Furthermore, the vessels used for laboratory mixing are typically more widely varied than those used for industrial mixing; for instance, Erlenmeyer flasks, or Florence flasks may be used in addition to the more cylindrical beaker.

== Mixing in microfluidics ==
When scaled down to the microscale, fluid mixing behaves radically different. This is typically at sizes from a couple (2 or 3) millimeters down to the nanometer range. At this size range normal advection does not happen unless it is forced by a hydraulic pressure gradient. Diffusion is the dominant mechanism whereby two different fluids come together. Diffusion is a relatively slow process. Hence a number of researchers had to devise ways to get the two fluids to mix. This involved Y junctions, T junctions, three-way intersections and designs where the interfacial area between the two fluids is maximized. Beyond just interfacing the two liquids people also made twisting channels to force the two fluids to mix. These included multilayered devices where the fluids would corkscrew, looped devices where the fluids would flow around obstructions and wavy devices where the channel would constrict and flare out. Additionally channels with features on the walls like notches or groves were tried.

One way to know if mixing is happening due to advection or diffusion is by finding the Peclet number. It is the ratio of advection to diffusion. At high Peclet numbers (> 1), advection dominates. At low Peclet numbers (< 1), diffusion dominates.

== Industrial mixing equipment ==
At an industrial scale, efficient mixing can be difficult to achieve. A great deal of engineering effort goes into designing and improving mixing processes. Mixing at industrial scale is done in batches (dynamic mixing), inline or with help of static mixers. Moving mixers are powered with electric motors that operate at standard speeds of 1800 or 1500 RPM, which is typically much faster than necessary. Gearboxes are used to reduce speed and increase torque. Some applications require the use of multi-shaft mixers, in which a combination of mixer types are used to completely blend the product.

In addition to performing typical batch mixing operations, some mixing can be done continuously. Using a machine like the Continuous Processor, one or more dry ingredients and one or more liquid ingredients can be accurately and consistently metered into the machine and see a continuous, homogeneous mixture come out the discharge of the machine. Many industries have converted to continuous mixing for many reasons. Some of those are ease of cleaning, lower energy consumption, smaller footprint, versatility, control, and many others. Continuous mixers, such as the twin-screw Continuous Processor, also have the ability to handle very high viscosities.

=== Turbines ===
A selection of turbine geometries and power numbers are shown below.

Selected Turbine Geometries and Power Numbers
Name	Power number	Flow direction	Blade angle (degrees)	Number of blades	Blade geometry
Rushton turbine	4.6	Radial	0	6	Flat
Pitched blade turbine	1.3	Axial	45–60	3–6	Flat
Hydrofoil	0.3	Axial	45–60	3–6	Curved
Marine Propeller	0.2	Axial	N/A	3	Curved

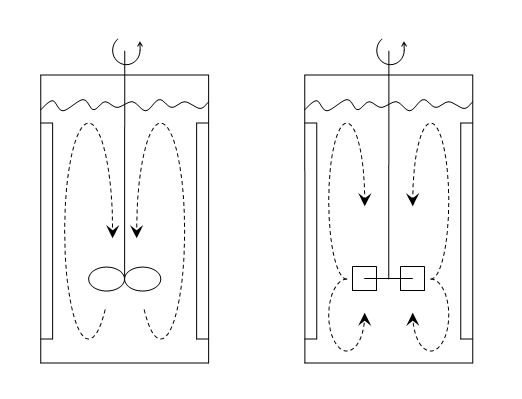
Axial flow impeller (left) and radial flow impeller (right).

Different types of impellers are used for different tasks; for instance, Rushton turbines are useful for dispersing gases into liquids, but are not very helpful for dispersing settled solids into liquid. Newer turbines have largely supplanted the Rushton turbine for gas–liquid mixing, such as the Smith turbine and Bakker turbine. The power number is an empirical measure of the amount of torque needed to drive different impellers in the same fluid at constant power per unit volume; impellers with higher power numbers require more torque but operate at lower speed than impellers with lower power numbers, which operate at lower torque but higher speeds.

=== Planetary mixer ===
A planetary mixer is a device used to mix round products including adhesives, pharmaceuticals, foods (including dough), chemicals, solid rocket propellants, electronics, plastics and pigments. Planetary mixers are ideal for mixing and kneading viscous pastes (up to 6 million centipoise) under atmospheric or vacuum conditions. Capacities range from 0.5 US pints (0.24 L; 0.42 imp pt) through 750 US gallons (2,800 L; 620 imp gal). Many options including jacketing for heating or cooling, vacuum or pressure, vari speed drives, etc. are available. Planetary blades each rotate on their own axes, and at the same time on a common axis, thereby providing complete mixing in a very short timeframe.

Large industrial scale planetary mixers are used in the production of solid rocket fuel for long-range ballistic missiles. They are used to blend and homogenize the components of solid rocket propellant, ensuring a consistent and stable mixture of fuel & oxidizer.

=== Resonant acoustic mixer ===
Resonant acoustic mixing (RAM) is able to mix, coat, mill, and sieve materials without impellers or blades touching the materials, yet typically 10X-100X faster than alternative technologies by generating a high level of energy (up to 100 g) through seeking and operating at the resonant condition of the mechanical system - at all times.

Resonant acoustic mixers from lab scale to industrial production to continuous mixing are used for energetic materials like explosives, propellants, and pyrotechnic compositions, as well as pharmaceuticals, powder metallurgy, 3D printing, rechargeable battery materials, and battery recycling.

=== Trajectory mixer ===
A trajectory mixer is an industrial mixing device in which the entire mixing vessel follows a high-frequent pre-defined two-dimensional motion path—typically a Lissajous curve—to induce mixing without the use of internal impellers or blades. This type of mixing system operates by accelerating the vessel rapidly along orthogonal axes, generating inertial forces that cause the contents to interact dynamically. The mixing is achieved by the motion of the product itself within the vessel, rather than by mechanical agitation.

The motion of the vessel is precisely controlled and fully programmable, allowing adjustments to the frequency, amplitude, and phase of the oscillations to influence the resulting flow patterns. Trajectory mixers engage the entire batch simultaneously, thereby reducing mixing time and energy consumption while minimizing mechanical stress on sensitive materials.

Trajectory mixing has been applied in a variety of industries, including food processing (e.g., massaging marinated meats), technical ceramics, refractory, and battery manufacturing, particularly for producing electrode slurries. In 2024, the technology was honored with the International FoodTec Award in Gold.

=== Close-clearance mixers ===
There are two main types of close-clearance mixers: anchors and helical ribbons. Anchor mixers induce solid-body rotation and do not promote vertical mixing, but helical ribbons do. Close clearance mixers are used in the laminar regime, because the viscosity of the fluid overwhelms the inertial forces of the flow and prevents the fluid leaving the impeller from entraining the fluid next to it. Helical ribbon mixers are typically rotated to push material at the wall downwards, which helps circulate the fluid and refresh the surface at the wall.

=== High shear dispersers ===
High shear dispersers create intense shear near the impeller but relatively little flow in the bulk of the vessel. Such devices typically resemble circular saw blades and are rotated at high speed. Because of their shape, they have a relatively low drag coefficient and therefore require comparatively little torque to spin at high speed. High shear dispersers are used for forming emulsions (or suspensions) of immiscible liquids and solid deagglomeration.

=== Static mixers ===
Static mixers are used when a mixing tank would be too large, too slow, or too expensive to use in a given process.

=== Liquid whistles ===
Liquid whistles are a kind of static mixer which pass fluid at high pressure through an orifice and subsequently over a blade. This subjects the fluid to high turbulent stresses and may result in mixing, emulsification, deagglomeration and disinfection.

=== Other ===
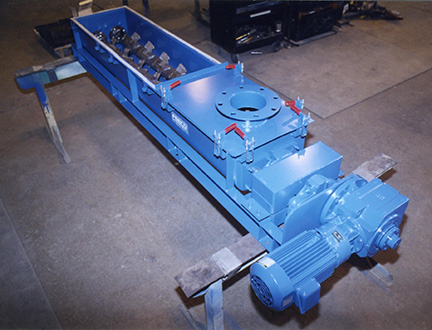
Industrial Paddle Mixer

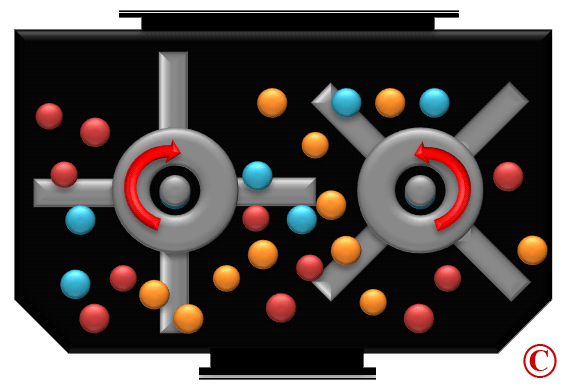
Industrial Paddle Mixer.

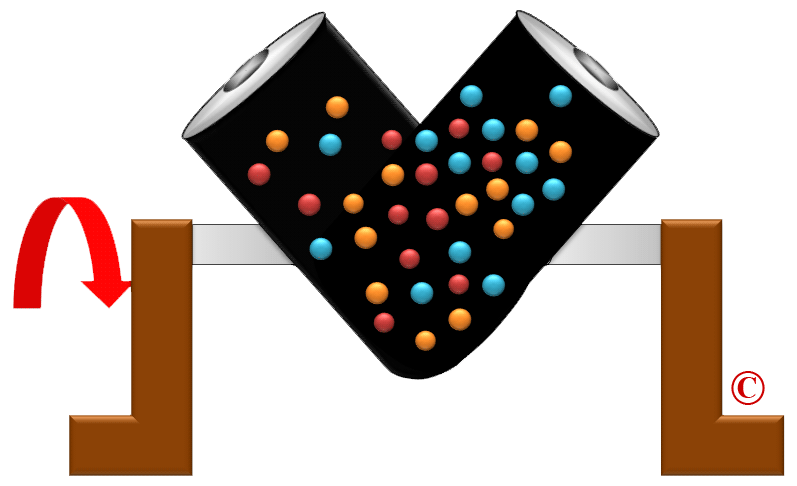
Industrial V Blender.

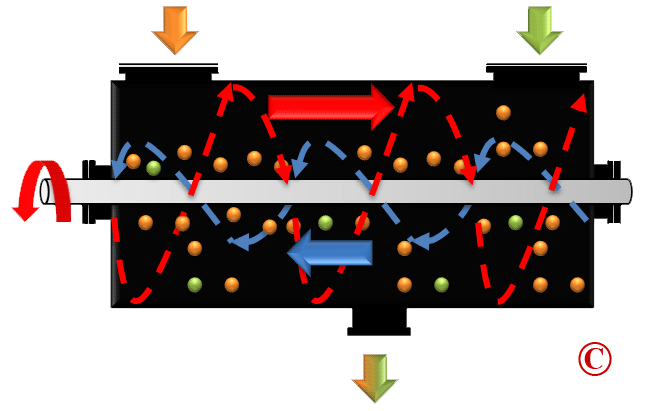
Industrial Ribbon Blender.

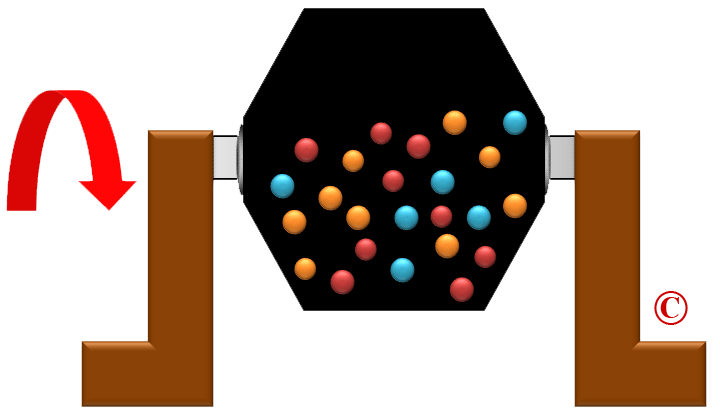
Industrial Double Cone Blender.

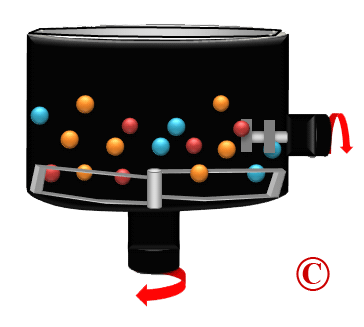
Industrial High shear Mixer/Granulator.

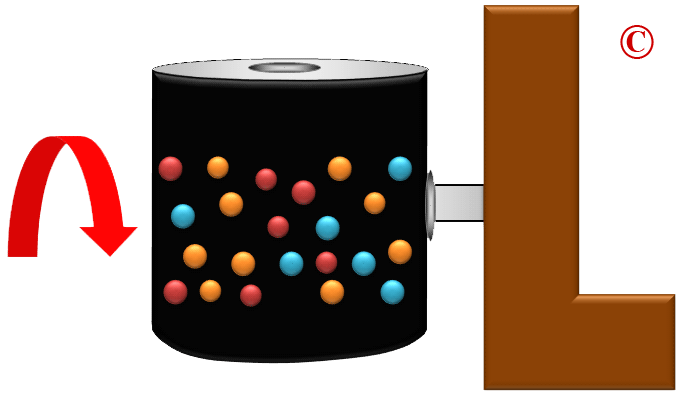
Drum-Blender

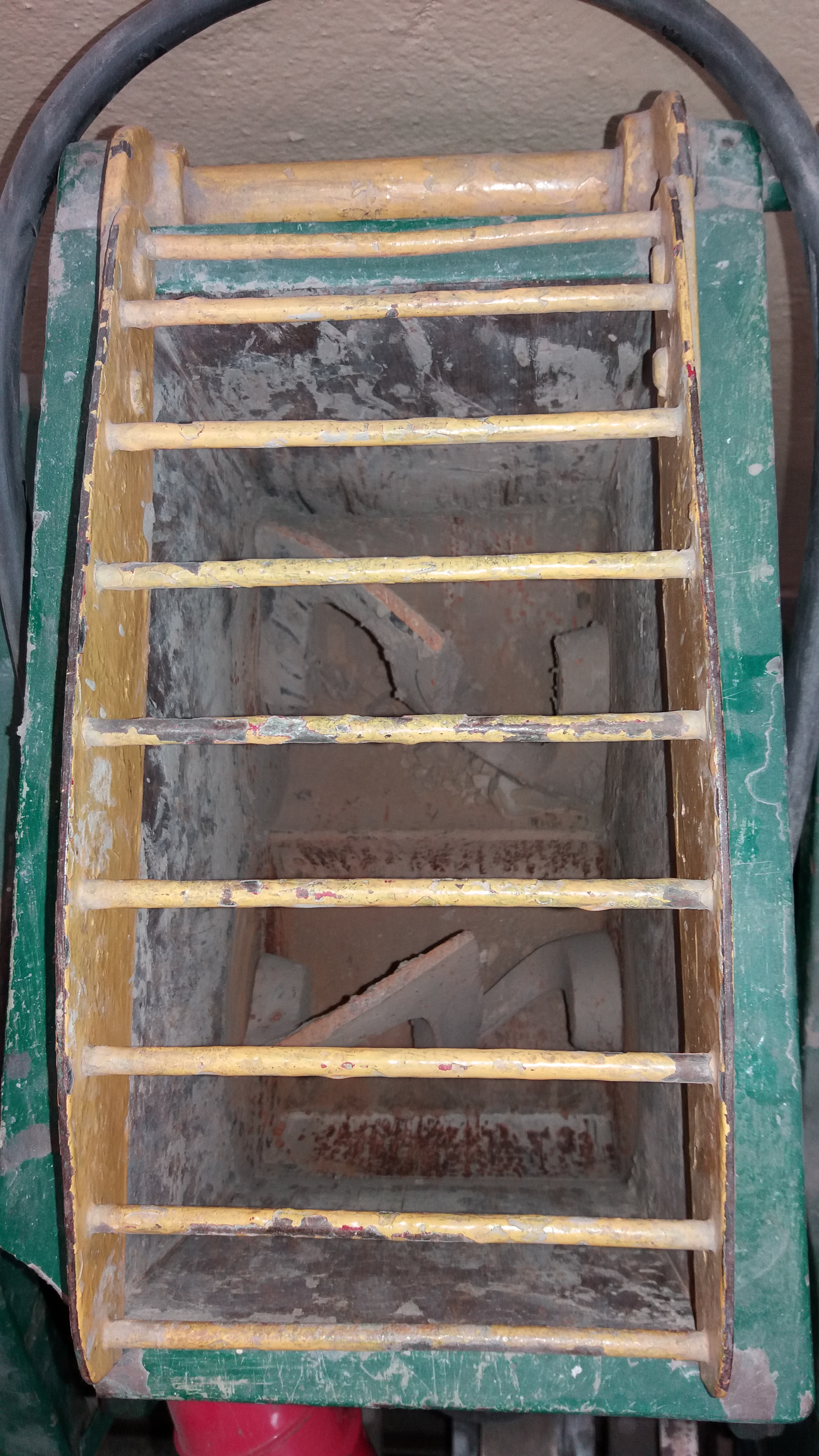
Double shaft mixer for high-viscosity materials

- Ribbon Blender
  Ribbon blenders are very common in process industries for performing dry-mixing operations. The mixing is performed thanks to 2 helix (ribbon) welded on the shafts. Both helix move the product in opposite directions thus achieving the mixing (see picture of ribbon blender).
- V Blender
- Twin-Screw Continuous Blender
- Continuous Processor
- Cone Screw Blender
- Screw Blender
- Double Cone Blender
- Double Planetary
- High Viscosity Mixer
- Counter-rotating
- Double & Triple Shaft
- Vacuum Mixer
- High Shear Rotor Stator
- Impinging mixer
- Dispersion Mixers
- Paddle
- Jet Mixer
- Mobile Mixers
- Drum Blenders
- Intermix mixer
- Horizontal Mixer
- Hot/Cold mixing combination
- Vertical mixer
- Turbomixer
- Banbury mixer
  The Banbury mixer is a brand of internal batch mixer, named for inventor Fernley H. Banbury. The "Banbury" trademark is owned by Farrel Corporation. Internal batch mixers such as the Banbury mixer are used for mixing or compounding rubber and plastics. The original design dates back to 1916. The mixer consists of two rotating spiral-shaped blades encased in segments of cylindrical housings. These intersect so as to leave a ridge between the blades. The blades may be cored for circulation of heating or cooling. Its invention resulted in major labor and capital savings in the tire industry, doing away with the initial step of roller-milling rubber. It is also used for reinforcing fillers in a resin system.

== See also ==
- Mixing paddle
