= Mixx (disambiguation) =

Mixx is a user-driven social networking website for news, pictures and video

Mixx may also refer to:

- Tokyopop (formerly called Mixx), a publisher of anime and manga
- BiGG MiXX, a short-lived Kellogg's breakfast cereal introduced in 1990
- Nu-Mixx Klazzics and Nu-Mixx Klazzics Vol. 2, remix albums from the rapper, Tupac Shakur
- Gutta Mixx, the fifth album from rapper, Bushwick Bill
- Mixx FM 91.9 (also known as DZLR Mixx FM), a radio station in Naga City
- Mixx FM a network of radio stations in Victoria, Australia owned by Ace Radio

== See also ==
- Mixxx, an open source digital DJing software
