= Shaker (laboratory) =

Laboratory device

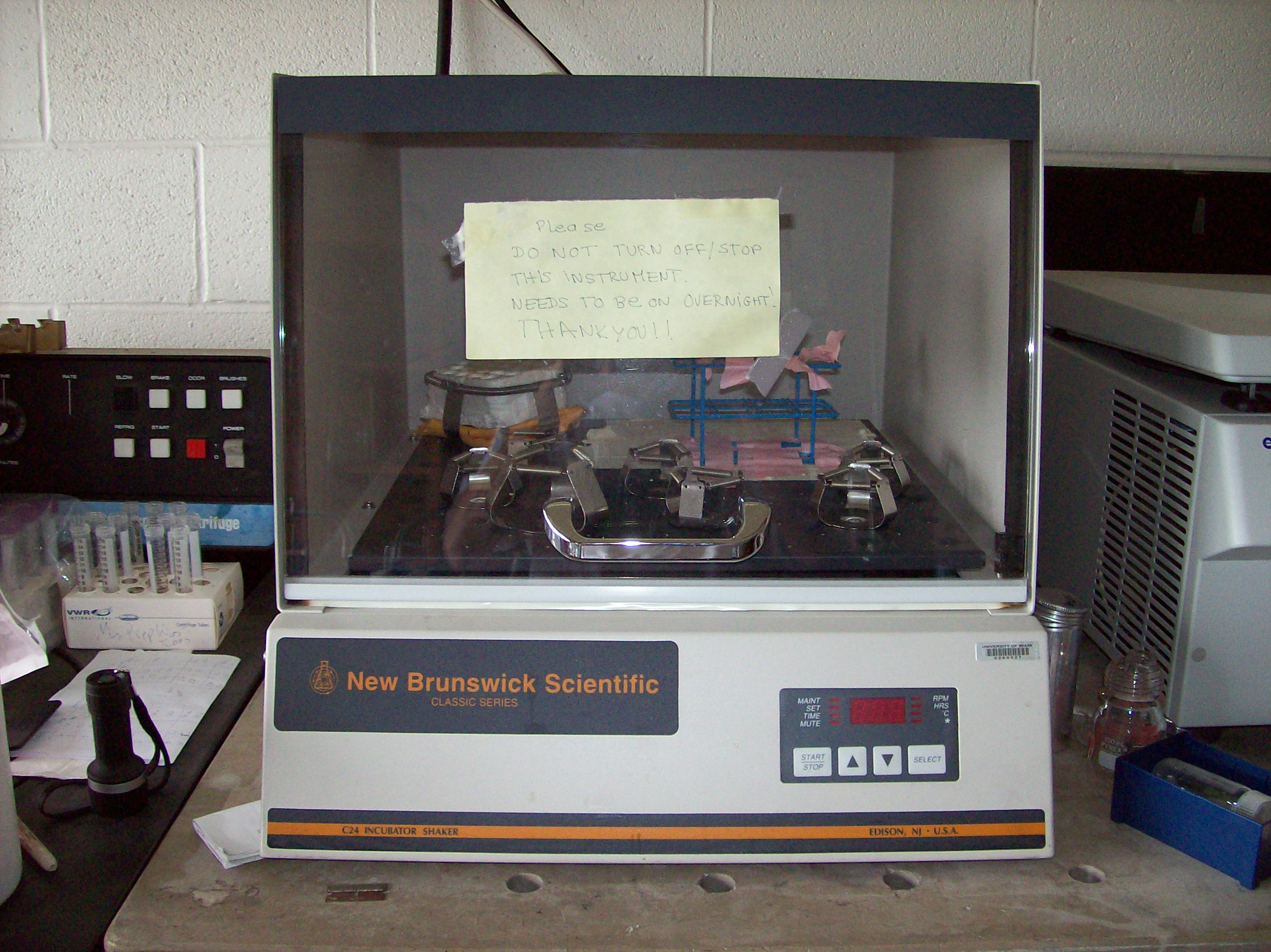
A temperature-controlled shaker, as used in biochemistry work

A shaker is a piece of laboratory equipment used to mix, blend, or agitate substances in a tube or flask by shaking them. It is mainly used in the fields of chemistry and biology. A shaker contains an oscillating board that is used to place the flasks, beakers, or test tubes. Although the magnetic stirrer has lately come to replace the shaker, it is still the preferred choice of equipment when dealing with large volume substances, when simultaneous agitation is required or when stirring bar could destroy delicate content like living cells.

== Types ==
=== Vortex shaker ===
Invented by Jack A. Kraft and Harold D. Kraft in 1962, a vortex shaker is a usually small device used to shake or mix small vials of liquid substance. Its most standout characteristic is that it works by the user putting a vial on the shaking platform and turning it on; thus, the vial is shaken along with the platform. A vortex shaker is very variable in terms of speed adjustment, for the shaking speed can be continuously changed while shaking by turning a switch.

=== Platform shaker ===
A platform shaker has a table board that oscillates horizontally. The liquids to be stirred are held in beakers, jars, or Erlenmeyer flasks that are placed over the table or, sometimes, in test tubes or vials that are nested into holes in the plate. Platform shakers can also be combined with other systems like rotating mixers for small systems and have been designed to be manufactured in laboratories themselves with open source scientific equipment.

=== Orbital shaker ===
An orbital shaker has a circular shaking motion with a slow speed (25-500 rpm). It is suitable for culturing microbes, washing blots, and general mixing. Some of its characteristics are that it does not create vibrations, and it produces low heat compared to other kinds of shakers, which makes it ideal for culturing microbes. Moreover, it can be modified by placing it in an incubator to create an incubator shaker due to its low temperature and vibrations.

=== Incubator shaker ===
An incubator shaker (or thermal shaker) can be considered a mix of an incubator and a shaker. It has an ability to shake while maintaining optimal conditions for incubating microbes or DNA replications. This equipment is very useful since, in order for a cell to grow, it needs oxygen and nutrients that require shaking so that they can be distributed evenly around the culture.

A vortex shaker in use.

Anyone employing an incubator shaker (thermal shaker) to grow yeast or bacteria in the laboratory needs to beware that under the usual conditions encountered in the lab, the rate at which oxygen diffuses from the gaseous phase into the shaken liquid phase is too slow to keep up with the rate at which the oxygen is consumed by, for example, E. coli dividing every half hour or Saccharomyces cerevisiae dividing every hour. If the investigator measure the oxygen in the shake flask on the shaker -- polarographically, for example -- at mid-exponential phase of growth, the dissolved oxygen concentration will turn out to be zero.

== Images ==
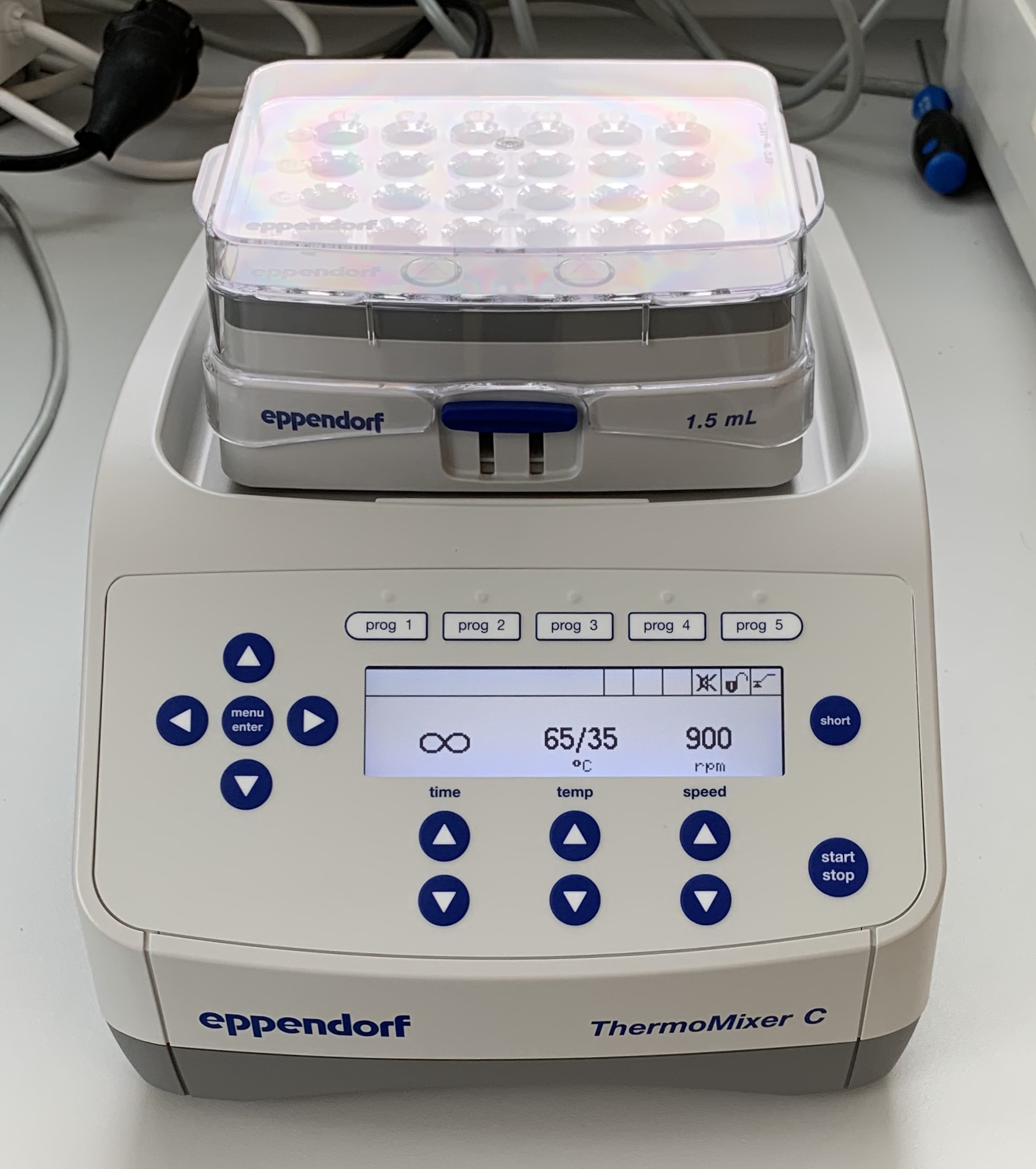
Thermal shaker for test tubes

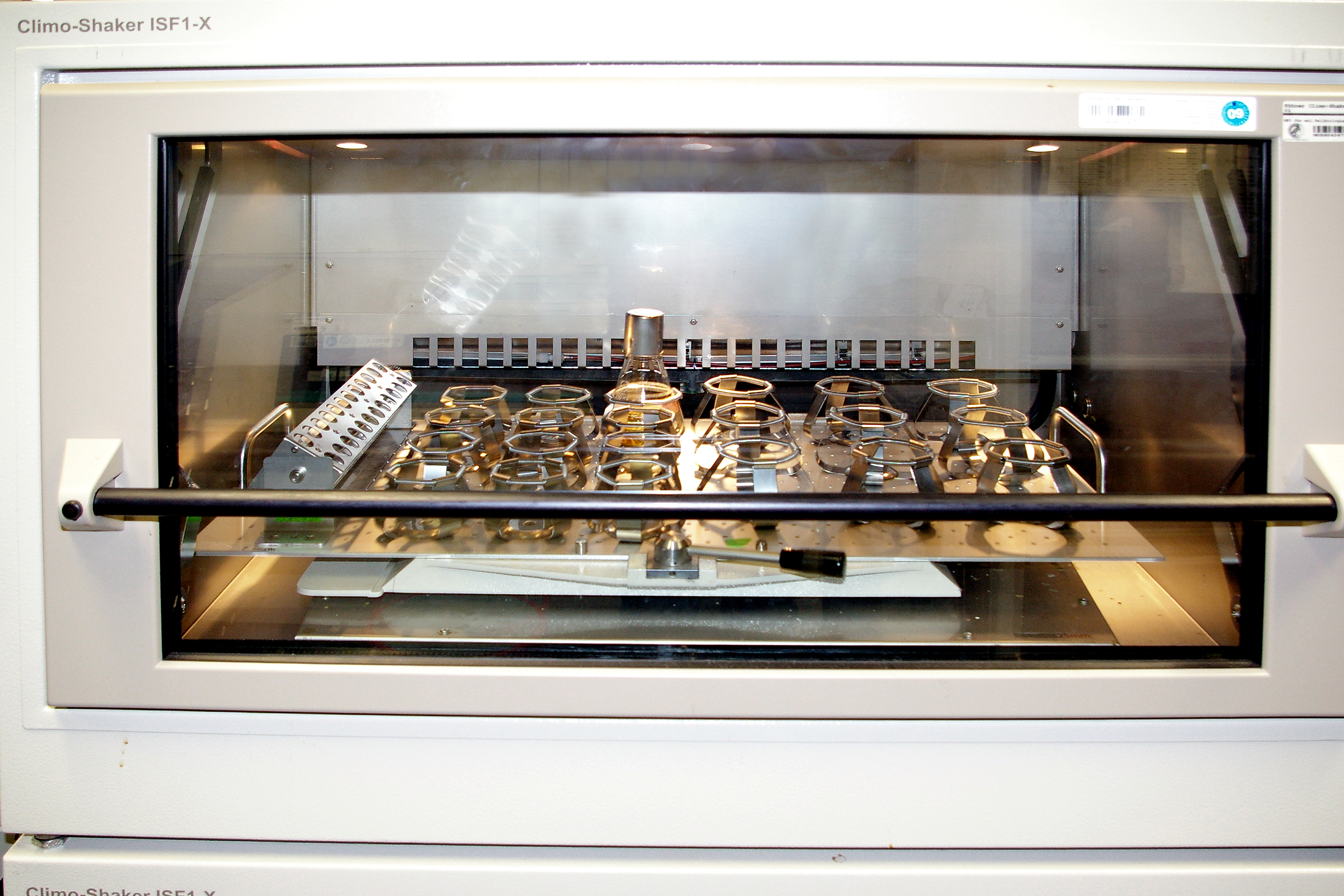
Shaking incubator for culture flasks

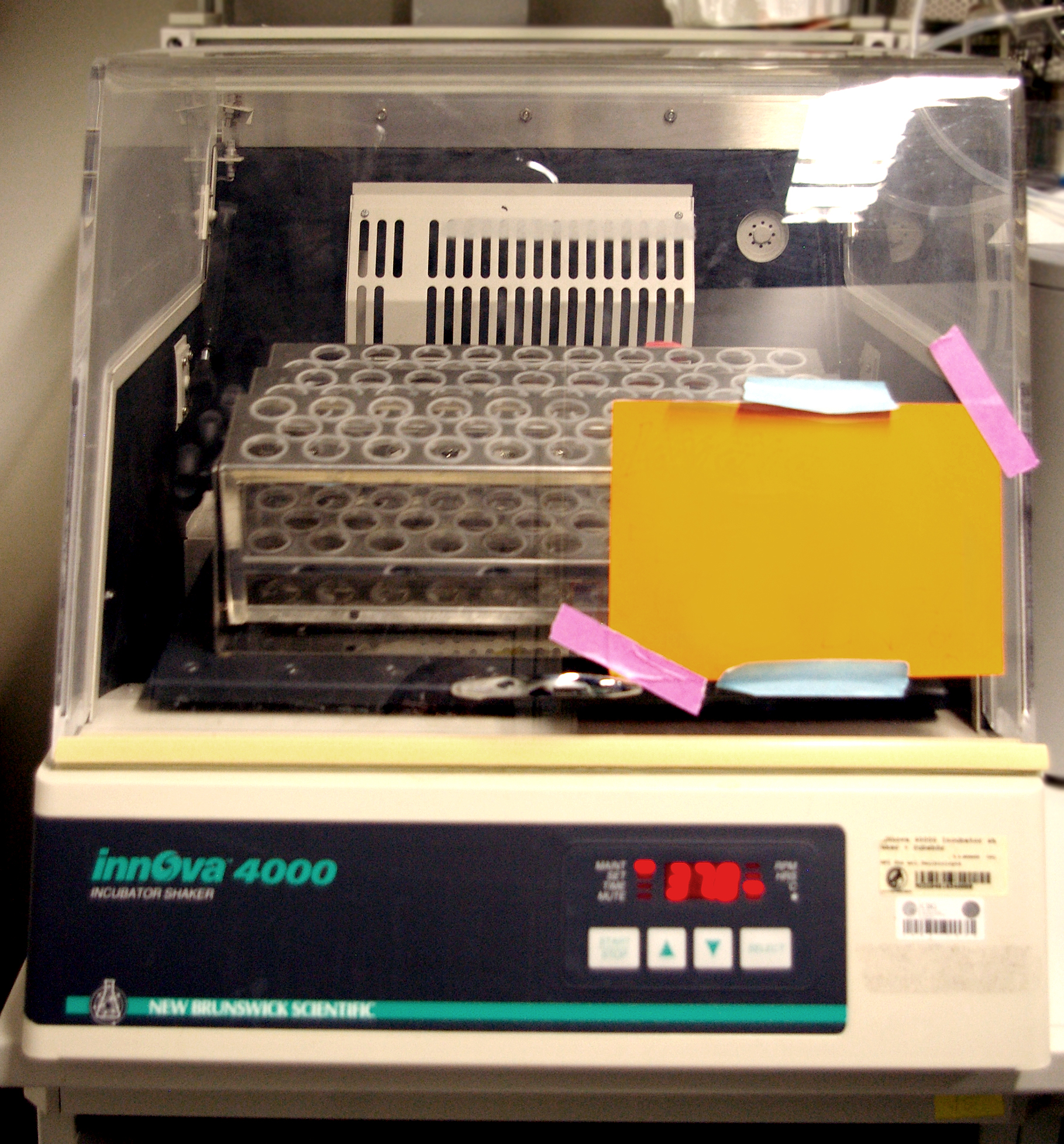
Shaking incubator for culture tubes

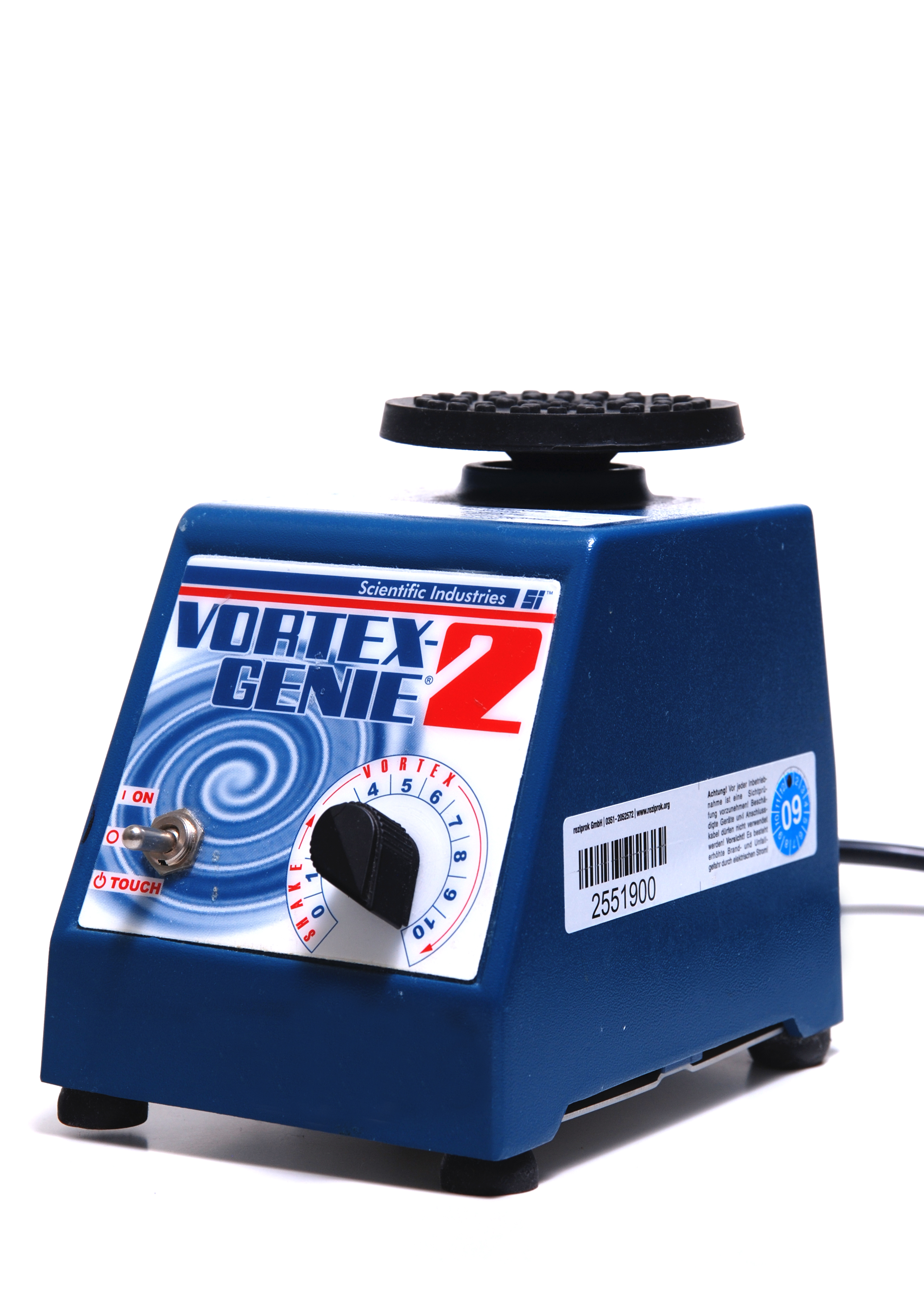
Vortex shaker

== See also ==
- Magnetic stirrer
- Vortex mixer
- Stirring rod
- Static mixer
