= Magnetic stirrer =

Laboratory device

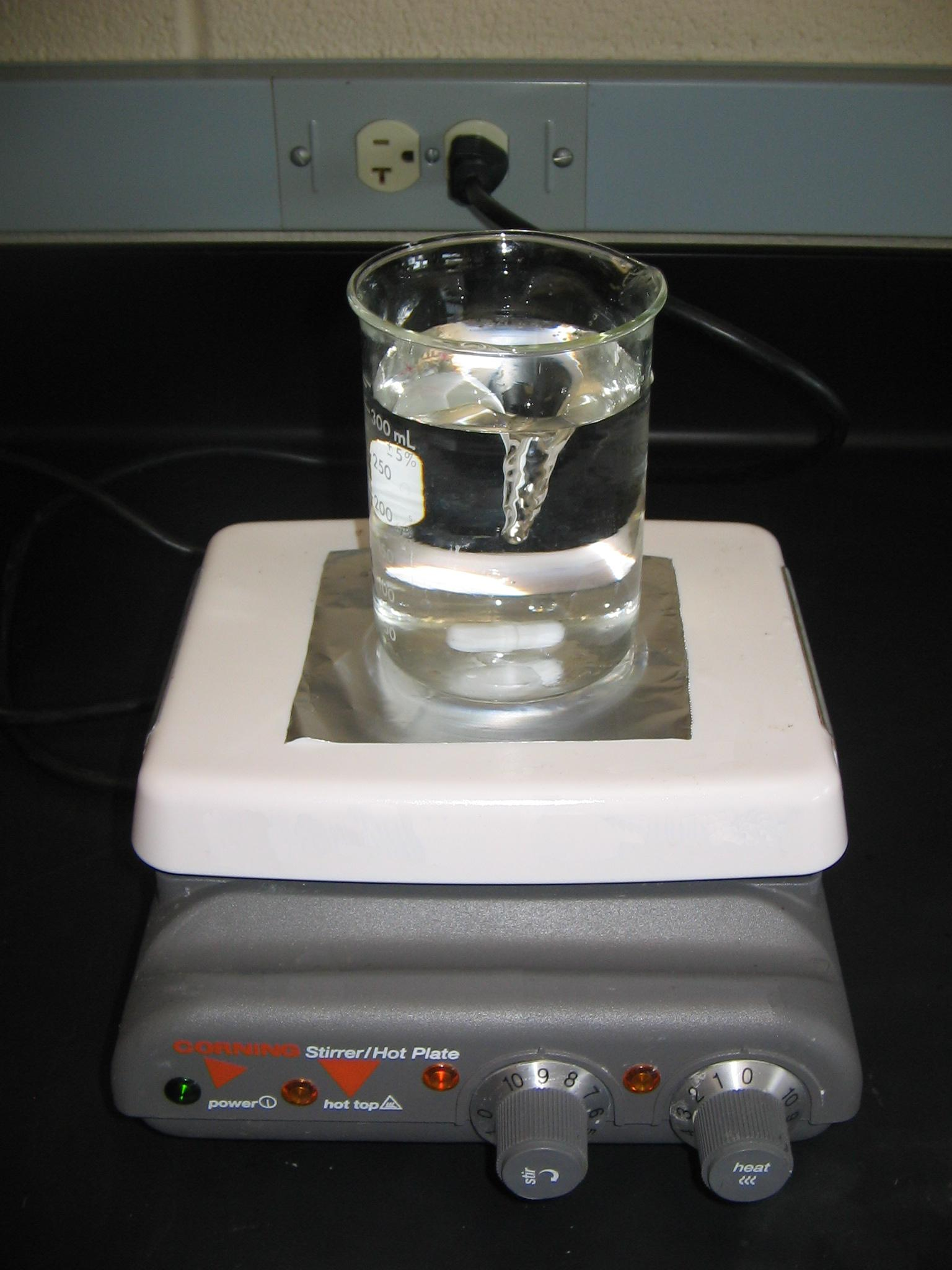
- A stir bar mixing a solution on a combined hot-plate magnetic-stirrer device; the left knob controls the stirring rate and the right knob controls heating
- Other names: Magnetic mixer
- Uses: Liquid mixing
- Inventor: Arthur Rosinger
- Related items: Vortex mixer, static mixer

A magnetic stirrer or magnetic mixer is a laboratory device that employs a rotating magnetic field to cause a stir bar (or flea) immersed in a liquid to spin very quickly, thus stirring it. The rotating field may be created either by a rotating magnet or a set of stationary electromagnets, placed beneath the vessel with the liquid. It is used in chemistry and biology as a convenient way to stir small volumes and where other forms of stirring, such as overhead stirrers and stirring rods, may not be viable.

== History ==
The first patent for a magnetic mixer is US 1,242,493, issued 9 October 1917 to Richard H. Stringham of Bountiful, Utah. Stringham's mixer used stationary electromagnets in the base, rather than a rotating permanent magnet, to rotate the stirrer.

Arthur Rosinger of Newark, New Jersey obtained US Patent 2,350,534, titled Magnetic Stirrer on 6 June 1944, having filed an application on 5 October 1942. Rosinger's patent includes a description of a coated bar magnet placed in a vessel, which is driven by a rotating magnet in a base below the vessel. Rosinger also explains in his patent that coating the magnet in plastic or covering it with glass or porcelain makes it chemically inert.

The plastic-coated bar magnet was independently invented in the late 1940s by Edward McLaughlin, of the Torpedo Experimental Establishment (TEE), Greenock, Scotland, who named it the 'flea' because of the way it jumps about if the rotating magnet is driven too rapidly.

The first multi-point magnetic stirrer was developed and patented by Salvador Bonet of SBS Company in 1977. He also introduced the practice of noting the denomination of stirring power in "litres of water", which is a market standard today.

== Design ==
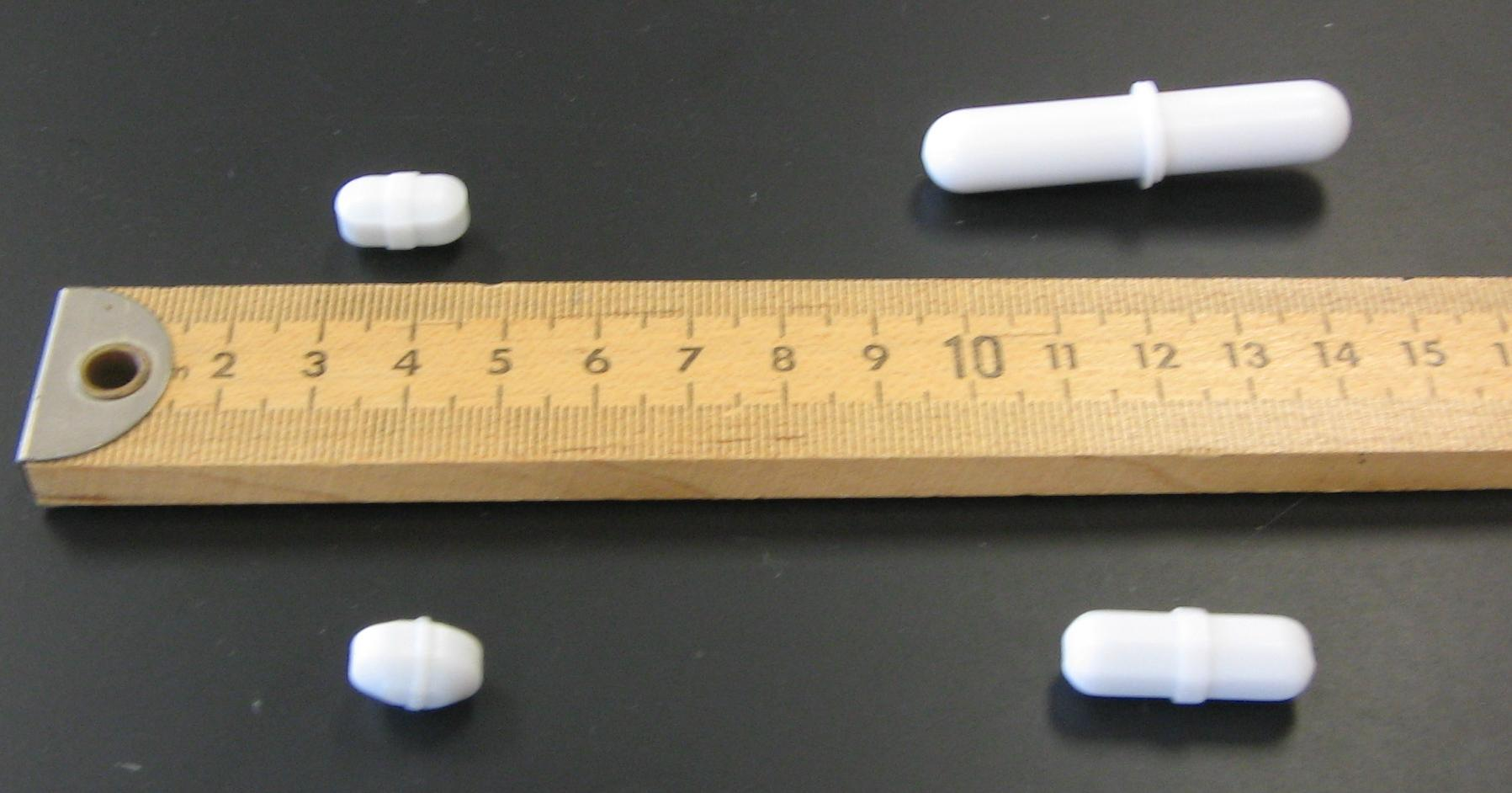
Four magnetic stir bars next to a metre stick

A magnetic stirrer consists of a magnetic bar placed within the liquid which provides the stirring action. The stir bar's motion is driven by another rotating magnet or assembly of electromagnets in the stirrer device, beneath the vessel containing the liquid. Stir bars are typically coated in PTFE, or, less often, in glass; the coatings are intended to be chemically inert, not contaminating or reacting with the reaction mixture they are in. Glass may be viable as an alternative if PTFE is unsuitable due to high temperature or chemical attack. In dissolving metal reductions that use an alkali metal dissolved in a primary amine, PTFE may be attacked to some extent. Birch reductions (a common dissolving metal reduction) are often conducted in a glass vessel, thus indicating that a glass stir bar would likewise be compatible. Glass can be attacked by strong alkali (such as lye) depending on heat, exposure time, and concentration.

Magnetic stirrers are bar-shaped and usually octagonal or circular in cross-section. A pointed oval shape is also common for use in round-bottom flasks. A variety of special shapes exist for more stable or efficient stirring in different conditions or to conform to the shape of small vessels. Many stir bars have a pivot ring around the center on which they rotate. The smallest are only a few millimeters long and the largest several centimeters. The smaller sizes (less than about 10mm) are often referred to as "fleas".

Laboratory hot plates often serve a dual purpose by incorporating both the stirring assembly and a heating element. Such heating elements may range in power from a few hundred to a few thousand watts, and allow the reaction flask to be heated and stirred at the same time. The maximum reachable fluid temperature depends on the size of the flask, the quantity of solution to be heated, the power of the heating element, and amount of insulation provided to the system.

The magnetic material within bars is most commonly alnico or samarium cobalt, which can withstand high temperatures without loss of magnetic strength, although for low temperature applications neodymium can be used, and ferrite stir bars exist.

Because of its small size, a stirring bar is more easily cleaned and sterilized than other stirring devices. They do not require lubricants which could contaminate the reaction vessel and the product.

A stir bar retriever is a separate magnet on the end of a long stick (also coated with chemically inert PTFE) which can be used to remove stir bars from a vessel.

== Uses ==
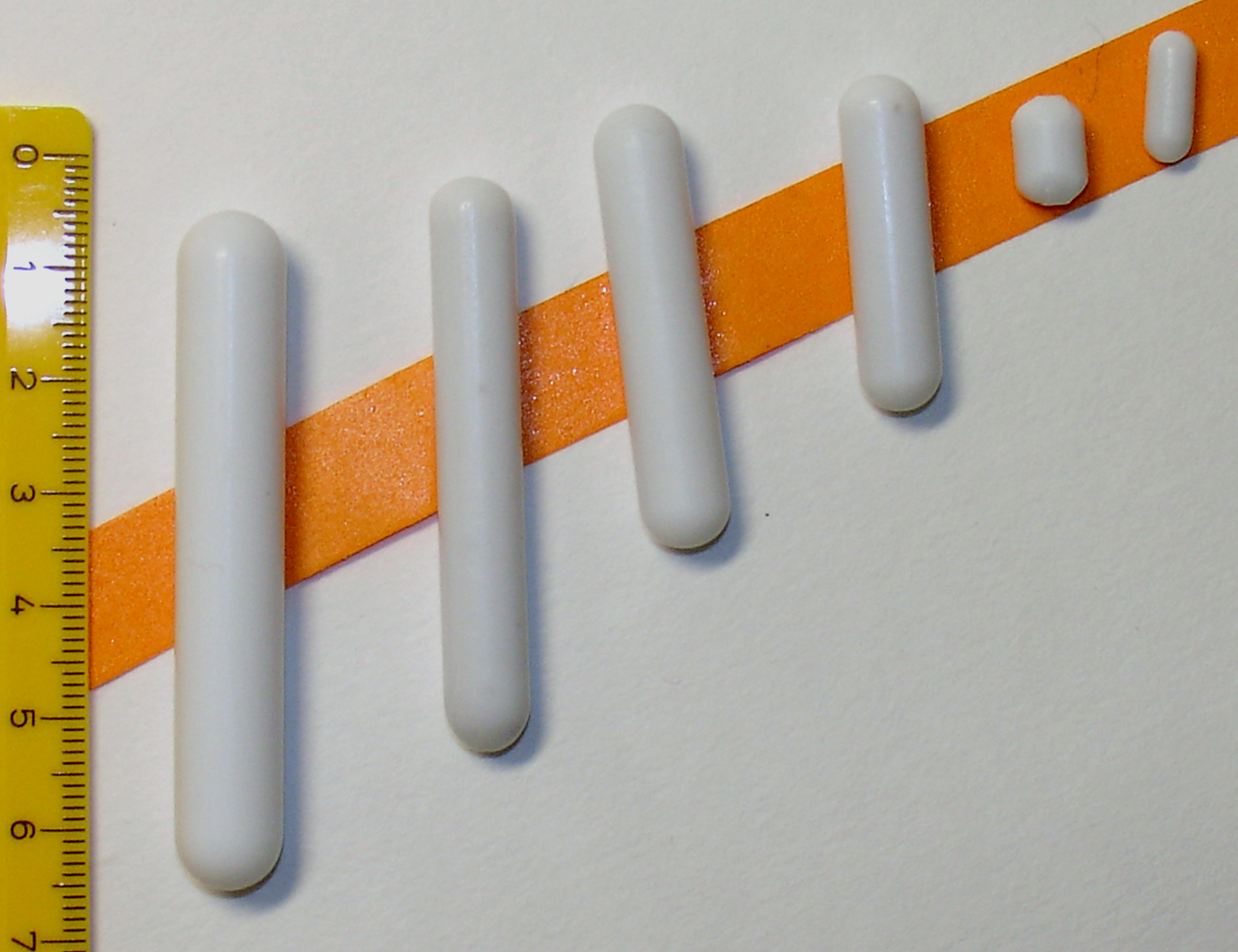
Different sizes of magnetic stir bars

A mixture of soil and deionized water is being stirred to calibrate pH

Magnetic stirrers are often used in chemistry and biology, where they can be used to stir hermetically closed vessels or systems without the need for complicated rot seals. They are preferred over gear-driven motorized stirrers because they are quieter, more efficient, and have no moving external parts to break or wear out (other than the simple bar magnet itself). Magnetic stir bars work well in glass vessels commonly used for chemical reactions, as glass does not appreciably affect a magnetic field.

The limited size of the bar means that magnetic stirrers can only be used for relatively small experiments, of 4 litres or less. Stir bars also have difficulty in dealing with viscous liquids or thick suspensions. For larger volumes or more viscous liquids, some sort of mechanical stirring (e.g., an overhead stirrer) is typically needed.

In synthetic chemistry, a combined magnetic stirrer/heater, equipped with a built-in temperature control mechanism and temperature probe, is commonly used with a heating bath (commonly oil, sand, or low-melting metal) or cooling bath (commonly water, ice, or an organic liquid mixed with liquid nitrogen or dry ice as coolant), allowing reactions vessels placed in the bath to be maintained at temperatures between approximately −120 and 250 °C (−184 and 482 °F).

== See also ==
- Shaker (laboratory) – Laboratory device
- Stirring rod – Laboratory glassware used for stirring
- Static mixer – Device for mixing two fluid materials in a tube containing a series of baffles
