= Policeman (disambiguation) =

A policeman is a warranted employee of a police force.

Policeman may also refer to:

- The Policeman, a 1971 Israeli film
- Policeman (butterfly), a genus of skipper butterflies
- Policeman (film), a 2011 Israeli film
- Policeman (horse), a racehorse
- "Policeman" (song), a 2015 song by Eva Simons
- Rubber policeman, a hand-held flexible natural-rubber scraper
- Policemen (film), a 1995 Italian crime-drama film
- Four Policemen, a proposed world order governed by the U.S., the U.K., the U.S.S.R., and China
