= Vortex mixer =

Laboratory device for mixing liquids

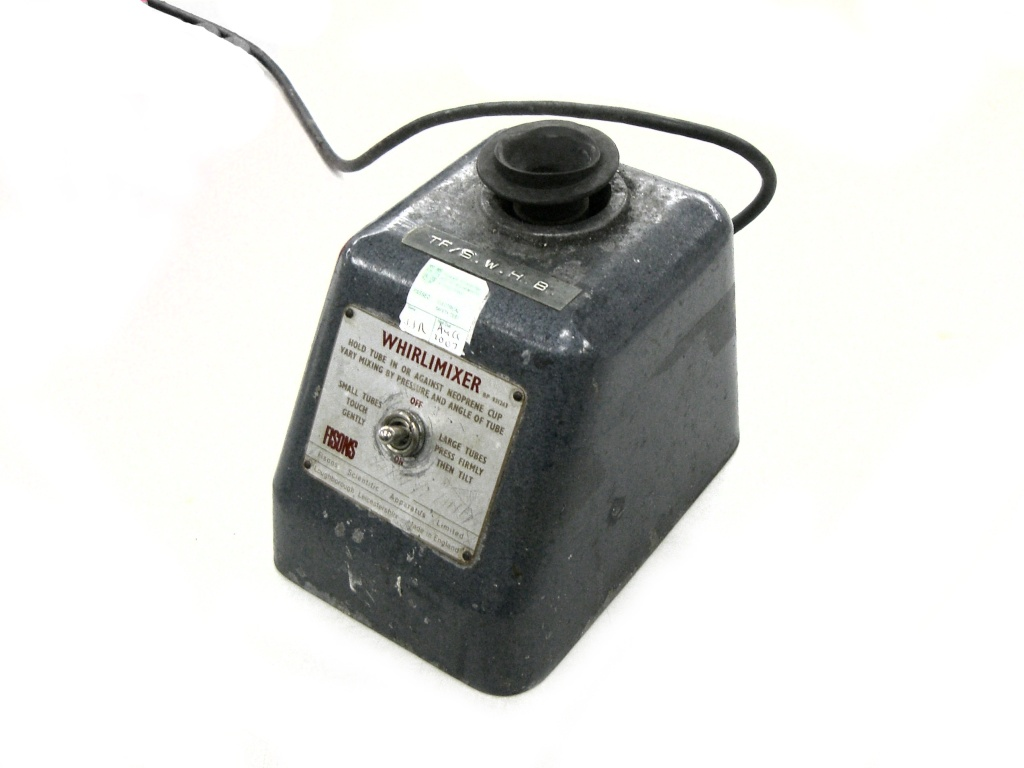
- A Whirlimixer brand vortex mixer
- Other names: Vortex shaker
- Uses: Liquid mixing
- Related items: Magnetic stirrer; Static mixer

A Scientific Industries Inc. Vortex-Genie 2 vortex mixer in operation

A vortex mixer, or vortexer, is a simple device used commonly in laboratories to mix small vials of liquid. It consists of an electric motor with the drive shaft oriented vertically and attached to a cupped rubber piece mounted slightly off-center. As the motor runs the rubber piece oscillates rapidly in a circular motion. When a test tube or other appropriate container is pressed into the rubber cup (or touched to its edge) the motion is transmitted to the liquid inside and a vortex is created. Most vortex mixers are designed with 2 or 4-plate formats, have variable speed settings ranging from 100 to 3,200 rpm, and can be set to run continuously, or to run only when downward pressure is applied to the rubber piece.

== Use ==
Vortex mixers are quite commonplace in bioscience laboratories. In cell culture and microbiology laboratories they may be used to suspend cells. In a biochemical or analytical laboratory they may be used to mix the reagents of an assay or to mix an experimental sample and a dilutant.

The vortex mixer was invented by brothers Jack A. and Harold D. Kraft while working for Scientific Industries, Inc., N.Y.,(a laboratory apparatus manufacturer). A patent was filed by the Kraft brothers on behalf of Scientific Industries, Inc. An alternative to the electric vortex mixer is the "finger vortex" technique in which a vortex is created manually by striking a test tube in a forward and downward motion with one's finger or thumb. This generally takes longer and often results in inadequate suspension, although it may be suitable in some cases when a vortex mixer is unavailable or the forces involved in vortexing would damage the sample, but this technique is not recommended when caustic substances are involved. The technique is better suited to accelerate the mixture of solutions which do not require the kinetic energy input needed to create suspensions.

== Microplate vortexing and incubating ==
For incubating applications, vortex mixers can employ precision temperature control at various mixing speeds which make them ideal for a wide variety of molecular biology applications including immunochemical reactions, enzyme and protein analysis, and microarray analysis.

== See also ==
- Magnetic stirrer
- Shaker
- Stirring rod
- Static mixer
