= Thermal cleaning =

Industrial cleaning techniques

Thermal cleaning is a combined process involving pyrolysis and oxidation. As an industrial application, thermal cleaning is used to remove organic substances such as polymers, plastics and coatings from parts, products or production components like extruder screws, spinnerets and static mixers. Thermal cleaning is the most common cleaning method in industrial environment. A variety of different methods have been developed so far for a wide range of applications.

== Process ==
Heat is supplied for pyrolysis and air is supplied for oxidation. Depending on the procedure, pyrolysis and oxidation can be applied consecutively or simultaneously. During thermal cleaning, organic material is converted into volatile organic compounds, hydrocarbons and carbonized gas. Inorganic elements remain. Typical process temperatures range between 400 and 540 °C (752 and 1,004 °F).

Several types of industrial thermal cleaning systems are available:

=== Fluidized bed systems ===
Fluidized bed systems use sand or aluminium oxide (alumina) as heating medium. They apply pyrolysis and oxidation simultaneously. These systems clean fast, from 30 minutes process time up to two hours. The medium does not melt or boil, nor emit any vapors or odors. Thermal shock can be a problem with some parts. Pollution control devices may be needed to protect the environment.

=== Vacuum ovens ===
Vacuum ovens use pyrolysis in a vacuum. This method is very safe because uncontrolled combustion inside the cleaning chamber is avoided. The cleaning process in this relatively new approach takes 8 to 30 hours. Vacuum pyrolysis is the only method that applies pyrolysis and oxidation consecutively. In two-chamber versions, molten plastic drains into an unheated chamber to capture the bulk of the polymer to reduce the fumes. Vacuum ovens are also electrically powered.

=== Burn-off ovens ===
Burn-off ovens, also known as heat-cleaning ovens, are gas-fired and used for removing organics from heavy and large metal parts. The process time is moderate, approximately 4 hours. Fires can occur from the fumes created during cleaning. The design is simple and inexpensive. Different types are available. Modern types contain an additional afterburner that operates at a minimum of 1,500 °F (820 °C) and consumes any smoke created by the process.

=== Molten salt baths ===
Molten salt baths belong to the oldest thermal cleaning systems. Cleaning with molten salt is fast: 15 to 30 minutes process time. The process has the risk of dangerous splatters due to chemical reactivity, or other potential hazards, like explosions or toxic hydrogen cyanide gas. Another disadvantage is that parts can be warped or altered in design tolerances. Molten salt baths can be environmentally unfriendly. Due to their disadvantages, they are rarely used today.

== Areas of application ==
- Plastics industry: Cleaning of production components like extruder screws, spinnerets, or static mixers, of plastic residues polymers.
- Remanufacturers: The rebuilding industry uses thermal cleaning to remove oils and greases from used parts such as engine blocks or starter housings.
- Rewinding industry: In the electric motor rewinding industry there are applications to clean motor components of resins, oils and greases.
- Industrial laboratories: Thermal cleaning is used to clean ceramics and glassware.
- General industrial applications: Thermal cleaning is used to remove paint, varnishes and coatings from industrial parts.

== See also ==
- Terminal cleaning
