= Torpedo Experimental Establishment =

Research department, British Royal Navy

Research Department overview
- Formed: 1943
- Preceding Research Department: Royal Gun Factory, Woolwich
- Dissolved: 1959
- Jurisdiction: (United Kingdom)
- Headquarters: Greenock, Scotland
- Research Department executive: Superintendent, Torpedo Experiment and Design

The Torpedo Experimental Establishment (T.E.E.) also known as the Admiralty Torpedo Experimental Establishment was a former research department of the British Department of Admiralty from 1947 to 1959. It was responsible for the design, development and production of torpedoes for the Royal Navy. In 1959 its work and staff merged with the Admiralty Underwater Weapons Establishment. The department was administered by the Superintendent, Torpedo Experiment and Design.

== History ==
Research into the development of torpedoes first occurred during the end of the 19th century. Initially this took place at the Royal Gun Factory, Woolwich. Further research work was then undertaken at the Royal Naval Torpedo Factory, Greenock, Scotland with additional torpedo experimentation being undertaken by a private contractor, the Whitehead Torpedo Works based in Weymouth, Dorset.

In 1937, the Admiralty acquired another factory at Alexandria, Scotland to boost production. With the advent of World War Two, the Whitehead Torpedo Works barely maintained the production outputs required of them and so, in 1943, the Admiralty decided to set up an additional department at the Alexandria site. Collectively these centres of research and development became known as the Torpedo Experimental Establishment. It continued to operate until 1959 when it was closed. Its work was continued by the newly created Admiralty Underwater Weapons Establishment (AUWE) based at Portland, Dorset, England.

The establishment was administered the Superintendent, Torpedo Experiment and Design.

== Superintendent, Torpedo Experiment and Design ==
Included:

1. 1942–1950, Captain F. T. de. M. Morgan. (also Superintendent Royal Naval Torpedo Factory, Greenock)
2. 1951–1958, H. Turner. (also Superintendent Royal Naval Torpedo Factory, Alexandria)
3. 1958–1959, Captain G. O. Symonds.

== Sources ==
1. Archives, National (1930–1960). "Admiralty: Royal Navy Torpedo Factory and Torpedo Experimental Establishment: Reports and Technical Notes". Richmond, London, England: The National Archives.
2. Commons, House of (1959). "Torpedo Experimental Establishment, Greenock (Hansard, 8 July 1959)". api.parliament.uk. Hansard.
3. Great Britain, Admiralty (1945). The Navy List. London, England: H.M. Stationery Office.
4. Great Britain, Admiralty (1946). The Navy List. London, England: H.M. Stationery Office.
5. Great Britain, Admiralty (1956). The Navy List. London, England: H.M. Stationery Office.
6. Harding, Richard (2002). The Royal Navy 1930-1990: Innovation and Defense. Cambridge, England: Routledge. ISBN 9781135753719.
