= Static mixer =

Device for mixing two fluid materials in a tube containing a series of baffles

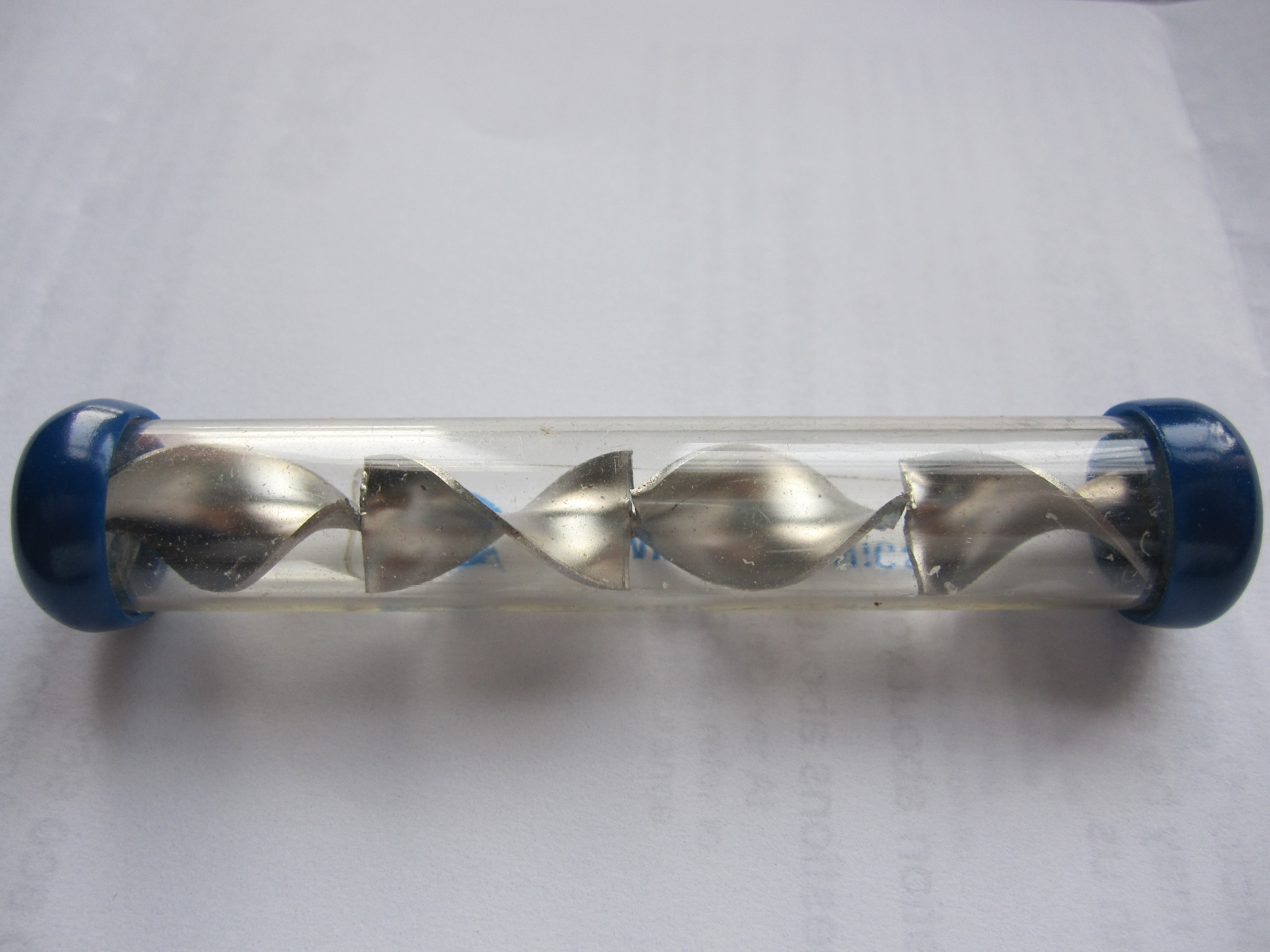
- A promotional sample of a helical static mixer enclosed in a clear tubular housing
- Uses: Mixing
- Related items: Magnetic stirrer, vortex mixer

A static mixer is a device for the continuous mixing of fluid materials, without moving components. Normally the fluids to be mixed are liquid, but static mixers can also be used to mix gas streams, disperse gas into liquid or blend immiscible liquids. The energy needed for mixing comes from a loss in pressure as fluids flow through the static mixer. One design of static mixer is the plate-type mixer and another common device type consists of mixer elements contained in a cylindrical (tube) or squared housing. Mixer size can vary from about 6 mm to 6 meters diameter. Typical construction materials for static mixer components include stainless steel, polypropylene, Teflon, PVDF, PVC, CPVC and polyacetal. The latest designs involve static mixing elements made of glass-lined steel.

== Design ==
=== Plate type ===
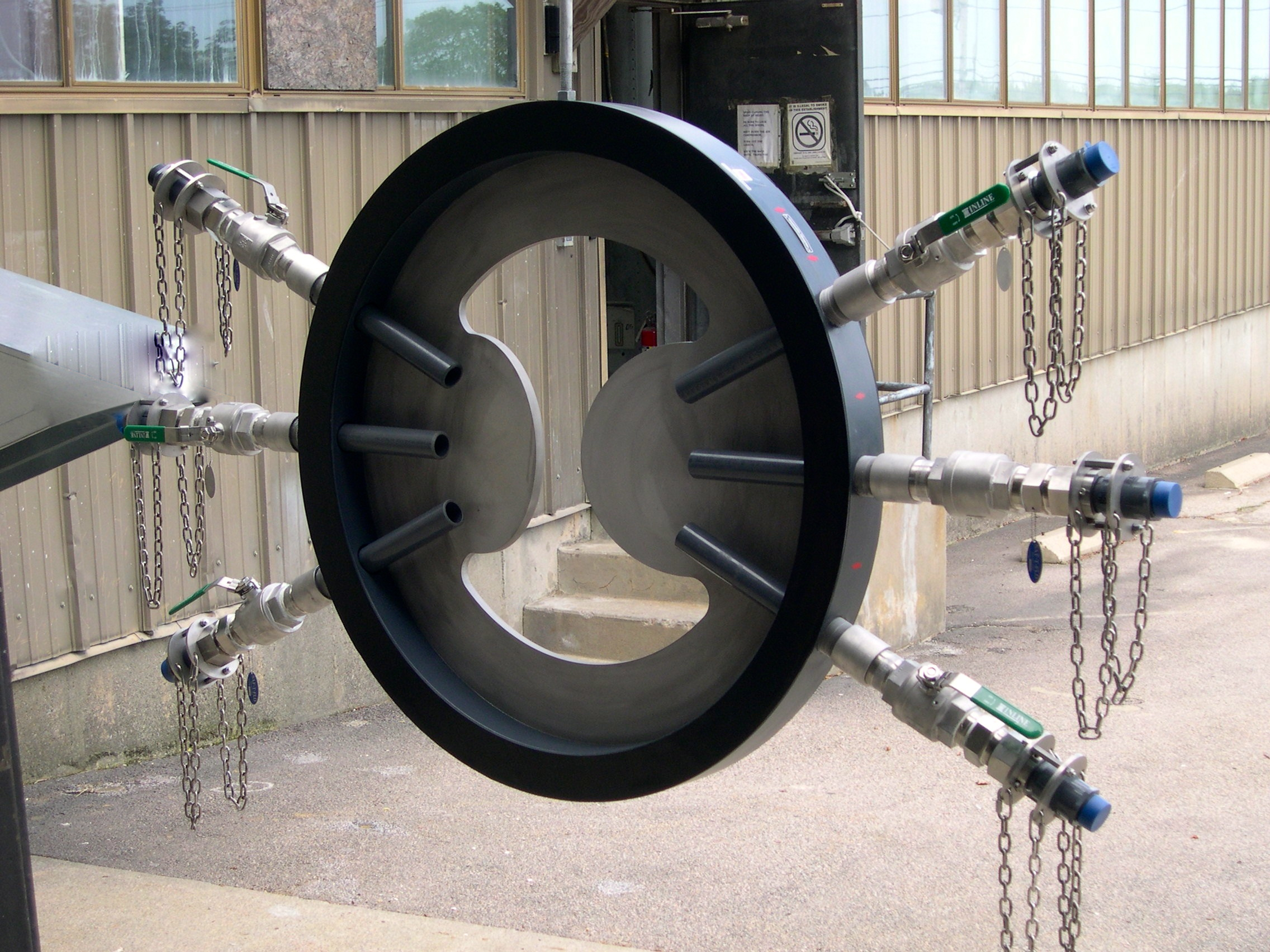
Plate-type static mixer

In the plate type design mixing is accomplished through intense turbulence in the flow.

=== Housed-elements design ===
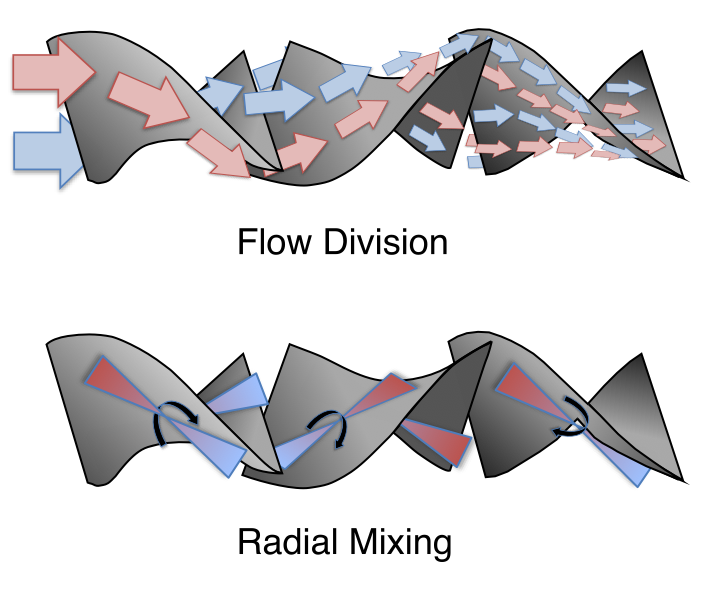
Depiction of how flow division and radial mixing can occur in a static mixer

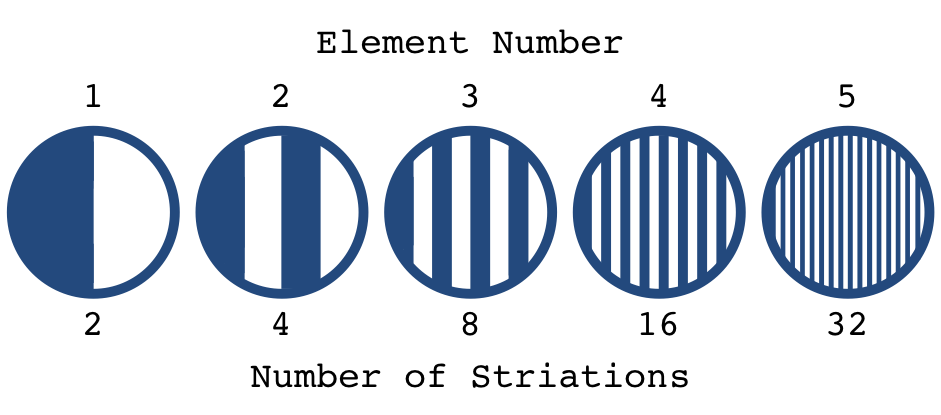
Flow division in a static mixer that uses baffles is a function of the number of elements in the mixer

In the housed-elements design the static mixer elements consist of a series of baffles made of metal or a variety of plastics. Similarly, the mixer housing can be made of metal or plastic. The housed-elements design incorporates a method for delivering two streams of fluids into the static mixer. As the streams move through the mixer, the non-moving elements continuously blend the materials. Complete mixing depends on many variables including the fluids' properties, tube inner diameter, number of elements and their design. The housed-elements mixer's fixed, typically helical elements can simultaneously produce patterns of flow division and radial mixing:

- Flow division: In laminar flow, a processed material divides at the leading edge of each element of the mixer and follows the channels created by the element shape. At each succeeding element, the two channels are further divided, resulting in an exponential increase in stratification. The number of striations produced is 2^{n} where 'n' is the number of elements in the mixer.
- Radial mixing: In either turbulent flow or laminar flow, rotational circulation of a processed material around its own hydraulic center in each channel of the mixer causes radial mixing of the material. Processed material is intermixed to reduce or eliminate radial gradients in temperature, velocity and material composition.

== Applications ==
A common application is mixing nozzles for two-component adhesives (e.g., epoxy) and sealants (see Resin casting). Other applications include wastewater treatment, flow chemistry and chemical processing. Static mixers can be used in the refinery and oil and gas markets as well, for example in bitumen processing or for desalting crude oil. In polymer production, static mixers can be used to facilitate polymerization reactions or for the admixing of liquid additives.

== History ==
The static mixer traces its origins to an invention for a mixing device filed on Nov. 29, 1965 by the Arthur D. Little Company. This device was the housed-elements type and was licensed to the Kenics Corporation and marketed as the Kenics Motionless Mixer. Today, the Kenics brand is owned by National Oilwell Varco. The plate type static mixer patent was issued on November 24, 1998, to Robert W. Glanville of Westfall Manufacturing.

== See also ==
- Thermal cleaning
