= Glass rod =

Laboratory glassware used for stirring

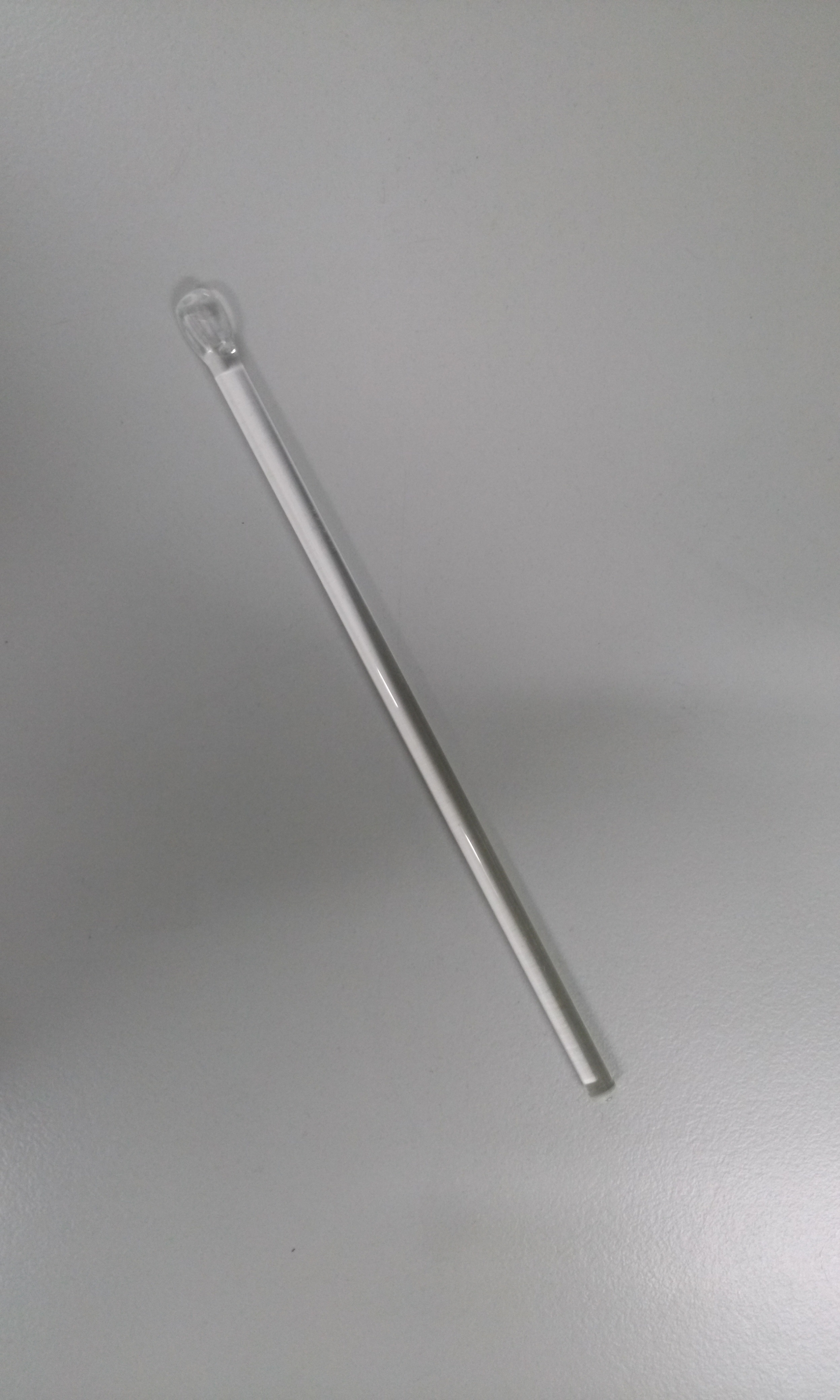
Example of a stirring rod

A glass stirring rod, glass rod, stirring rod or stir rod is a piece of laboratory equipment used to mix chemicals. They are usually made of solid glass, about the thickness and slightly longer than a drinking straw, with rounded ends.

== Structure ==
Stir rods are generally made of borosilicate (commonly known as Pyrex) glass or polypropylene plastic. They are usually between 10 and 40 centimeters in length and about half a centimeter in diameter. Glass rods are created from a single length of thin glass that is then cut into smaller segments. The ends are generally rounded (for example, by flame polishing) to prevent scratching the surface of glassware during use, which may lead to cracks if the glassware is later heated. Other shapes are possible, such as a flat paddle which can be used to circulate sediment, a triangular paddle to imitate a rubber policeman or a round button used to crush solids.

== Uses ==
A stirring rod is used for mixing liquids, or solids and liquids.

Stir rods are used as part of proper laboratory technique when decanting supernatants because the contact helps to negate the adhesion between the side of the glassware and the supernatant that is responsible for the liquid running down the side. Using a stir rod also grants more control over the rate of flow, which is important in cases where chemicals may react violently. This process is also used to pour a large-mouthed flask or beaker into a test tube.

Glass rods can also be used to induce crystallization in a recrystallization procedure, when they are used to scratch the inside surface of a test tube or beaker.

They can also break up an emulsion during an extraction.

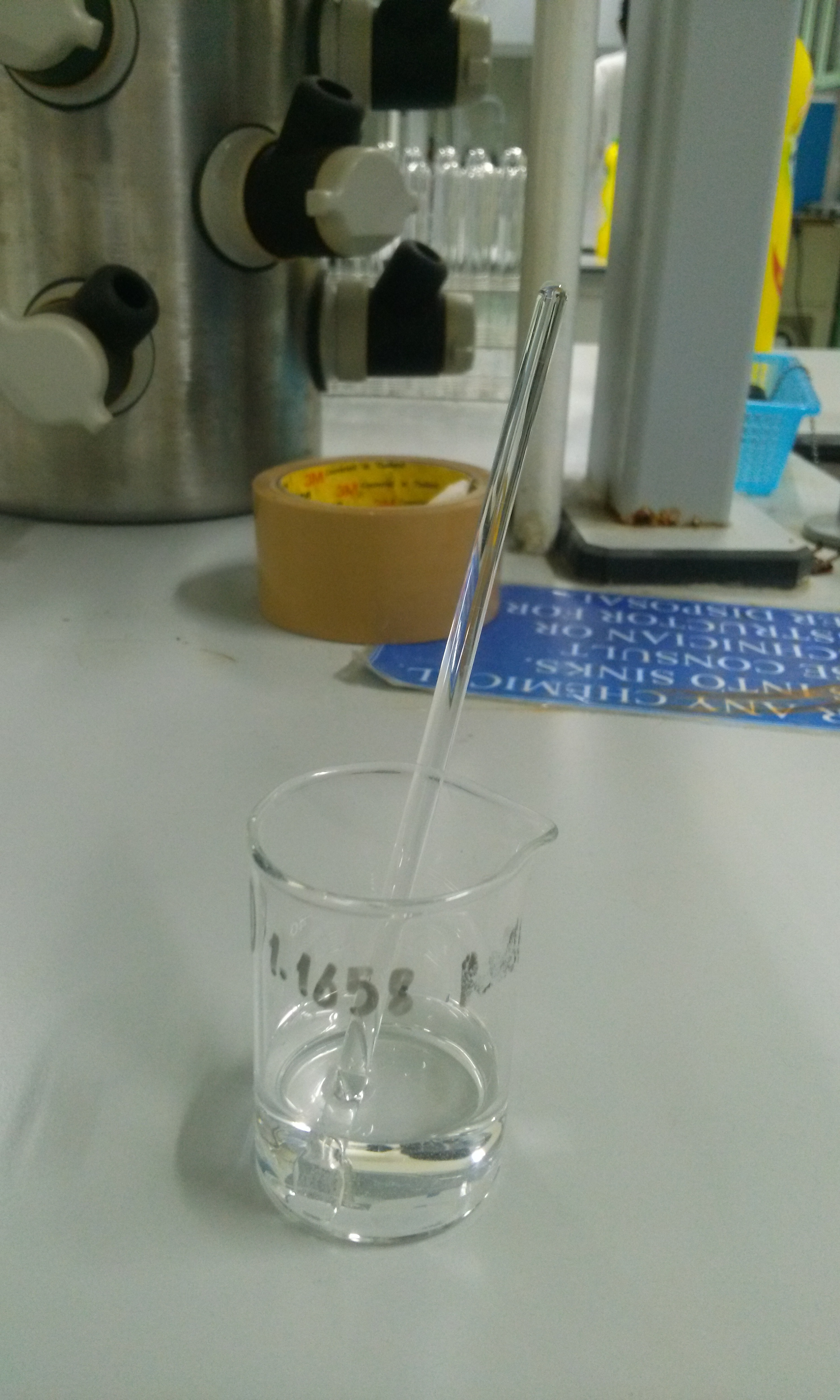
Stir rod in beaker

=== Teaching ===
These are two classic physics experiments performed using glass rods.

==== Vanishing rods experiment ====
This experiment introduces students to the concept of an index of refraction in a liquid. Glass rods are placed in beakers of liquid, in this case oil and water. In water, the glass rods are visible because the refractive index of water is different for water and glass. In the oil, however, the glass rods seem to disappear because they have a refractive index very similar to that of glass, so the light does not bend as it crosses the glass/oil interface.

==== Electrification ====
Glass rods can also be used to demonstrate electrification by friction. This occurs when there are two surfaces rubbing together. In this instance, rubbing a glass rod with silk transfers negative charge from it. This effect is known as the triboelectric effect and can be performed with a variety of materials. Because glass rods and silk are relatively common, they are often chosen to demonstrate this effect.

== See also ==
- Magnetic stirrer
- Rubber policeman
- Swizzle stick
