= Skil =

Brand name of power tools

SKIL Power Tools
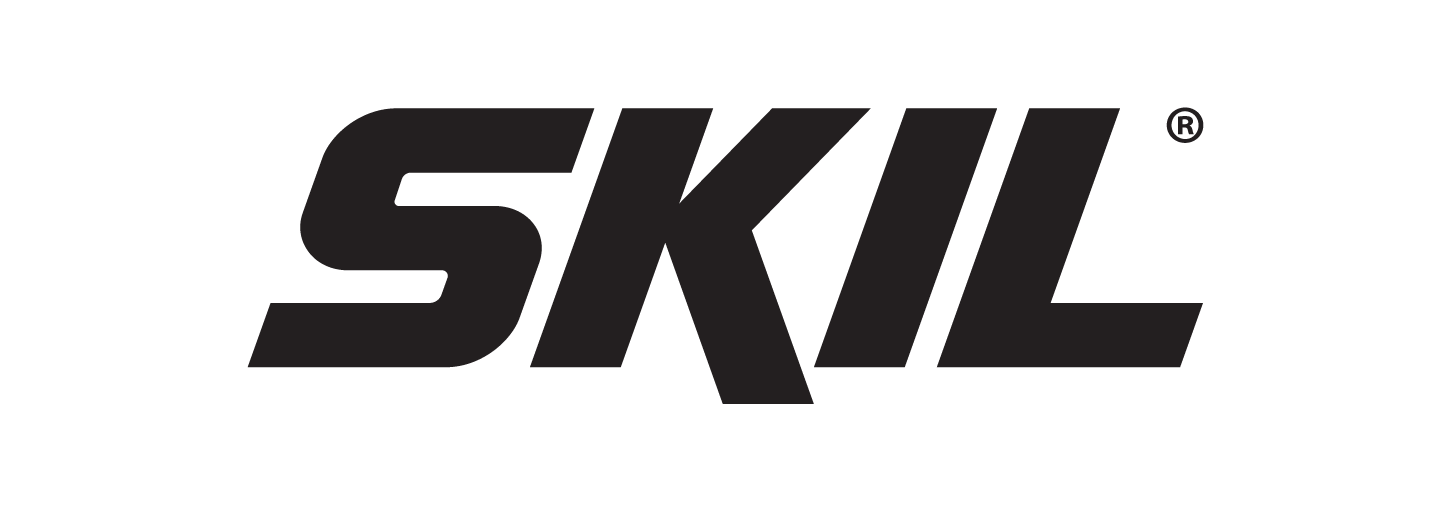
- Skil logo
- Type: Subsidiary
- Industry: Power tools
- Founded: 1926; 100 years ago
- Founder: Edmond Michel
- Headquarters: Naperville, Illinois, U.S.
- Products: Power tools
- Parent: Chervon (HK) Ltd
- Website: skil.com

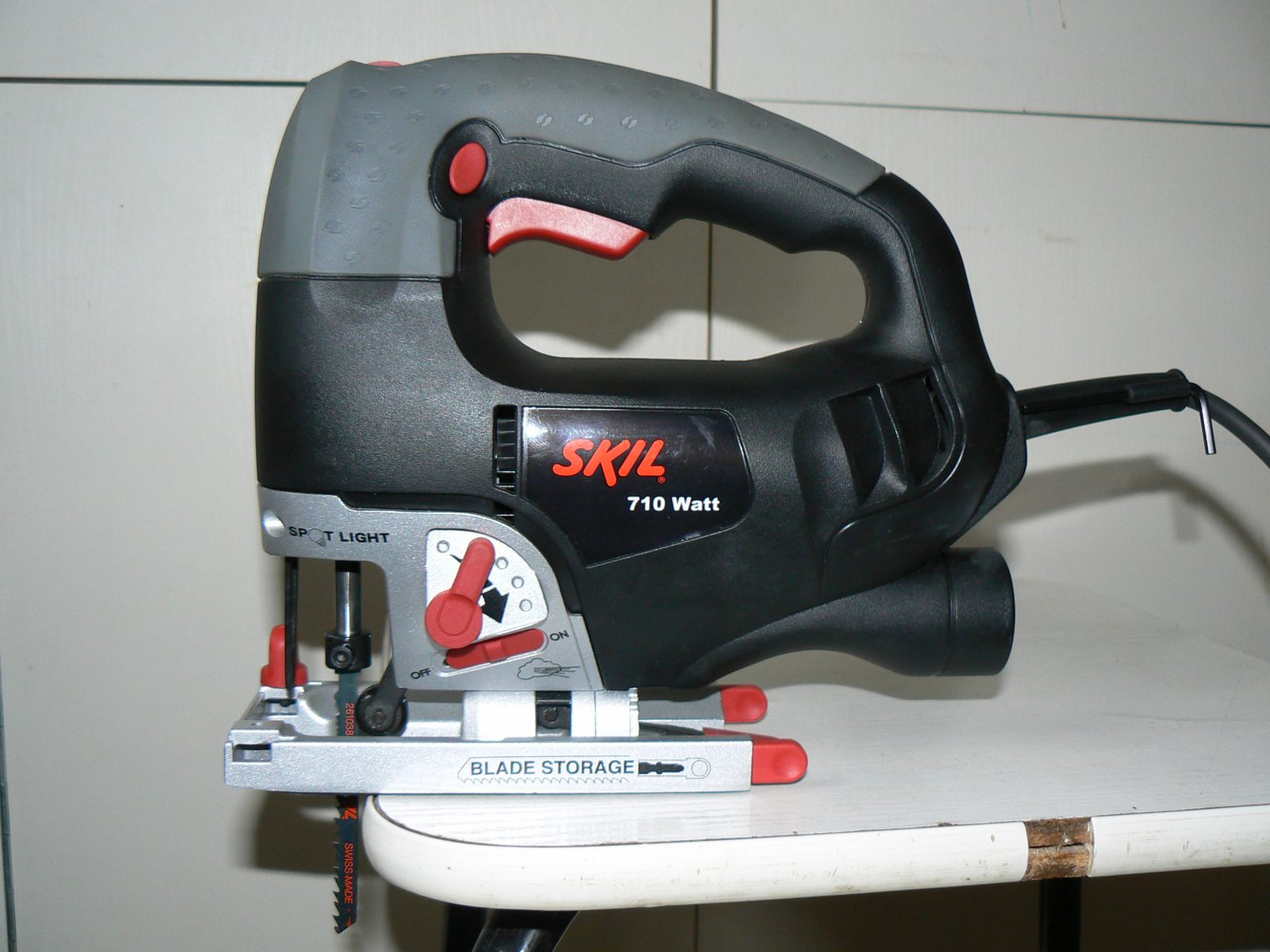
Skil jigsaw

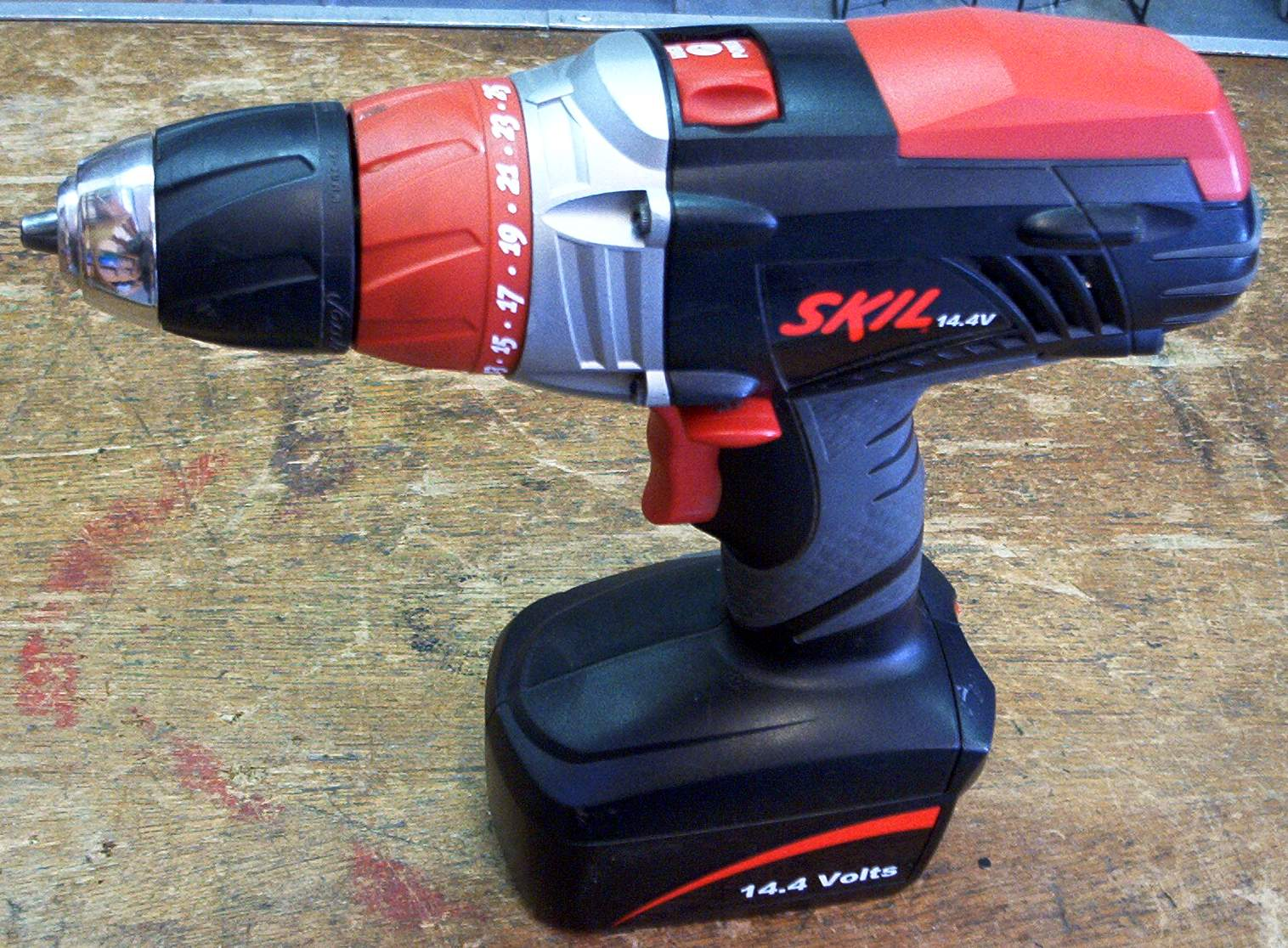
Skil cordless drill

SKIL Power Tools is a brand of electric power tools and accessories in Naperville, Illinois, United States. It is a subsidiary of Chervon (HK) Ltd, a company based in Nanjing, China.

The company focuses more on the do-it-yourself consumer, but at one time they made professional construction-grade power tools, which are now being sold under their subsidiary, SKILSAW.

SKIL can trace its heritage to the invention of the circular saw by Edmond Michel in 1924, which led to the development of the SKILSAW circular saw Model 77 in 1937. Referred to as “the saw that built America,” the Model 77 set the industry standard for handheld worm drive circular saws which remain in production almost unchanged today. In an example of a genericized trademark, portable circular saws are often still called Skilsaws or Skil saws.

Skil products include circular saws, cordless drill/drivers, cordless screw drivers, cordless tackers, cordless sealant guns, belt sanders, random orbital sanders, multi-sanders, angle grinders, hammers, drills, mixers, jigsaws; lasers and measuring tools; reciprocating saws, routers, and planers.

== History ==
Old Skil logo

In the early 1920s, Edmond Michel, a French immigrant in New Orleans with a penchant for tinkering and inventing, watched a group of farmers hack away at sugarcane with large machetes. After observing the painstaking labor the workers went through, he began experimenting with how to mechanize the machete. In 1923, Michel created a motorized machete, which had a 6-inch (150 mm) saw-blade mounted on carved wooden frame and powered with a motor taken from a malted milk mixer–the first electric hand saw.

After reading about Michel’s new invention, Joseph Sullivan, a Minneapolis land developer, set out to find the New Orleans inventor. After deciding to go into business together, Michel and Sullivan moved to Chicago and opened the Michel Electric Handsaw Co. in 1924. After forming the company, six production models were made at $1000 each. Michel went to the new Million Dollar Boardwalk in Atlantic City, New Jersey to demonstrate the new tools, where the first portable electric saw was purchased for $160 by the pier's developer.

In 1926, the Skil brand name was born after Michel left the company to pursue other ventures, and Sullivan changed the company name to Skilsaw, Inc.

=== Skilsaw Model 77 Invented ===
Before the Great Depression In 1928, Skil released the Model E Skilsaw, the first generation saw with a worm drive. In 1937, Edward Sterba built the first Model 77 with a 7 1/4-inch (180 mm) blade, considered to be the "workhorse on building sites". The 75th anniversary of the Model 77 was in 2012.

=== World War II ===
During World War II, Skil developed the PS-12 circular saw for military applications by mounting an air-driven Thor motor on a 12-inch (300 mm) worm-driven saw for use in several types of construction. Manufactured in camouflage colors, with the saw blade painted black and the body a greenish color, the saw worked just about everywhere, including underwater to cut piles or timbers. The U.S. Navy had Skil put the tool into a special camouflage box coated and sealed with plastic. When they were unable to get into a landing area, the unit would be dumped overboard then floated or dragged in for use on aircraft landing areas.

=== Post World War II ===
After the end of World War II, Skil began expanding into international markets by opening a distribution and service center in Toronto, in 1946. After selling directly to customers for 25 years, since the company’s inception, Skil entered the wholesale business and began distributing its products through hardware distributors. In the 1950s, the company changed its name to the Skil Corporation. Skilsaw remained the brand name used for the company's products. European sales followed a few years later, by which time Skil had entered the consumer market. By 1959 it had a full and successful range of DIY tools.

Skil's European factory was built in 1961 in Breda, Netherlands followed soon after by an electric motor plant at Eindhoven. After successfully entering the European market, Skil opened additional offices in Switzerland, the Netherlands, France, Belgium, Denmark and Germany by the end of 1961.

=== Skil in Australia - 1960s ===
Skil entered the Australian market in the early 1960s, by acquiring the Australian company Sher Powertools. Sher was a quality tool and sold at a premium price intended to compete with the European brands of Wolf and Desoutter which were well established fine quality brands of tools at the time.

=== 1970s onwards ===
In the 1970s onwards, Skil constructed a network of factories, service centers, and sales offices all around the world, its name becoming synonymous with power tools. Skil still has its European head office in Breda. All manufacturing of power tools for the European market is outsourced, mainly to China. Pre-development, logisitics, sales, marketing and financial operations are among the activities of the Dutch head office.

=== Since 1979 ===
Emerson Electric acquired Skil Corporation on March 23, 1979. Under new ownership, Skil continued to grow. In late 1979, Skil redesigned many of its tools to have heavy-duty plastic, double-insulated housings. In 1982, the company embarked on a program to become the most successful power tool company in the U.S. by investing heavily in new manufacturing and quality-control systems. In 1985, Skil's heavy duty and super duty tool lines were renamed "Skil/ Skilsaw Professional".

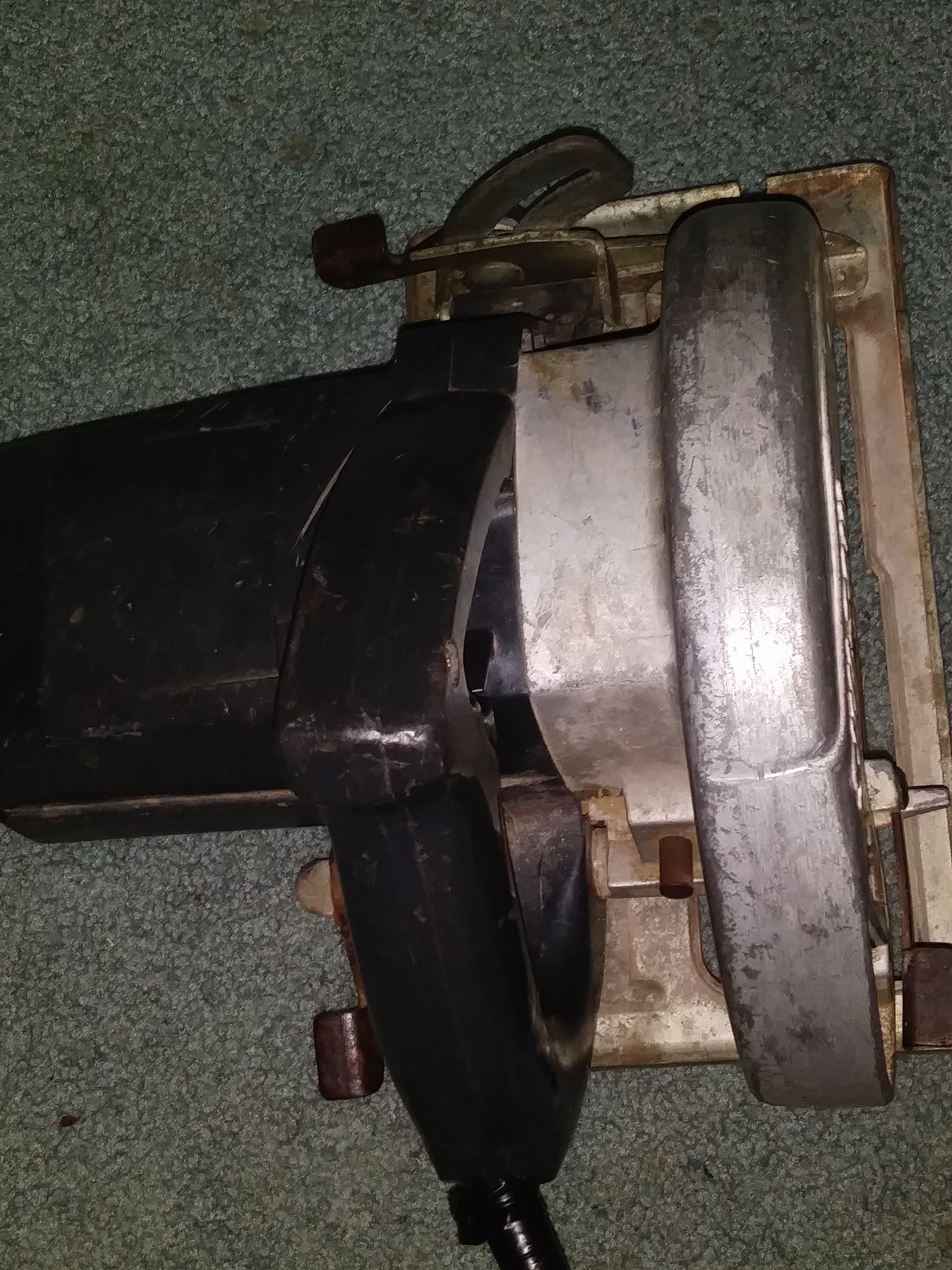
A 1985 Skilsaw Model 5625, Formerly Model 552

In 1991, the Emerson Electric Company and Robert Bosch GmbH entered into a joint venture by combining their power tool subsidiaries. In 1992, the new venture came to fruition as S-B Power Tool Co. In 1996, after four years of the partnership, Robert Bosch GmbH took over complete ownership of Skil. On August 23, 2016, Chervon (HK) Ltd., a power tool manufacturer based in Nanjing, China, agreed to acquire the SKIL brand from the Bosch Power Tools division, which gave them control over the SKIL businesses in both North America and the European market.

== See also ==
- Skilsaw
