= MV Glücksburg =

A number of ships have carried the name Glücksburg, including:

- MV Glücksburg (1943)
- MV Glücksburg (1959)
