= Marcel Desoutter =

André Marcel Desoutter (31 January 1894–13 April 1952) was an English aviator, who lost a leg in an early flying accident, but went on to a successful career in the aviation industry.

== Early life ==
Desoutter was one of six children of Louis Albert Desoutter, an immigrant French watchmaker, and Philomène Duret. Along with his four brothers, Rene, Charles, Louis and Robert, Marcel trained as a watchmaker.

== Aviation career ==
Learning to fly with the Blériot Company at their Hendon works, he passed the flying tests at the age of 17, but could not receive his licence until he was 18, receiving Royal Aero Club Aviators' Certificate no. 186 on 27 February 1912. He became an instructor, test and demonstration pilot.

Desoutter's accident occurred at the London Aviation Meeting held at Hendon Aerodrome at Easter 1913: whilst flying his 50-h.p. Gnome-Blériot on the afternoon of 23 March, the control stick slipped from his hand and the Blériot dived into the ground at the edge of the aerodrome. Desoutter's leg was badly broken, and later had to be amputated above the knee.

He was fitted with the standard wooden leg, but his younger brother Charles used his knowledge of aircraft materials to design a new jointed Duralumin alloy leg of half the weight, with which he was able to return to flying.

In 1914 the pair formed a company, Desoutter Brothers Limited, at 73 Baker Street, London, to manufacture the legs. The firm expanded greatly during and after the First World War, and moved to The Hyde, Hendon in 1924, where they manufactured both artificial limbs and the pneumatic portable Desoutter Tools which had been developed initially as a sideline.

Marcel married Margaret F. Rust in 1918; they had three children.

Marcel Desoutter left the business in 1928 and formed the Desoutter Aircraft Company Ltd. at Croydon to build the Dutch Koolhoven F.K.41 three-seat monoplane, renaming it as the Desoutter I. 41 of this type and the improved Desoutter II were produced, but the business folded in 1932 after its main customer, National Flying Services at London Air Park, Hanworth, went into liquidation.

In 1935 Desoutter became a partner with Morris Jackaman in Airports, Ltd., which had been set up to develop Gatwick and Gravesend aerodromes as airports, and was still managing director of the company when he died at his home in Horley, Surrey on 13 April 1952.
