= Hans Stråberg =

Swedish businessman (born 1957)

- Born: Hans Stråberg; February 22, 1957 (age 69)
- Education: Chalmers University
- Years active: 1983 to 2010
- Employer: Electrolux
- Known for: President & CEO of Electrolux, Director & Member of Remuneration Committee of Stora Enso Oyj, Bilderberg participant
- Successor: Keith McLoughlin

Hans Stråberg (born 1957 in Västervik, Sweden) is a Swedish business executive serving as the chairman of Atlas Copco and SKF. He was the president and CEO of Electrolux AB from 2002 to 2010, and was among the youngest CEOs of a Fortune Global 500 company. Stråberg has also participated in the Bilderberg Meetings.

== Education ==
Stråberg holds a Master of Science, Mechanical Engineering, Chalmers University of Technology, in 1981.

He is a reserve officer in the Swedish Army

== Professional life ==
Stråberg joined Electrolux in 1983 and moved to a senior management position in 1987. Between 1983 and 2002, he held several management positions at Electrolux in Sweden and the United States.

After finishing his studies, Stråberg became assistant to the Swedish technical attaché in Washington, D.C., 1981–1983. Stråberg joined Electrolux in 1983. He had various positions within the company and in 1987 he got his first managerial position as a global responsibility for dishwashers and washing machines. In 1992, he became plant manager at the vacuum cleaner factory in Västervik. Stråberg moved in 1995 to the United States with responsibility for the Group's appliance development and production in North America. With his team he introduced a front-loading washers in the United States, a product which in 2010 had a market share of 12 percent. In 1998, he came into the Group Management as vice president and head of Electrolux vacuum cleaner business and small appliances products of the company. During his time as head of Electrolux vacuum cleaner business his team developed the world's first automatic vacuum cleaner, the Trilobite. In 2001 he became Chief Operating Officer of Electrolux and appointed to take over the CEO post in 2002. He succeeded Michael Treschow. Stråberg was president and CEO of AB Electrolux 2002–2011. He was one of the youngest CEOs of a Fortune Global 500 companies.

== Directorships ==
Stråberg is chairman of Atlas Copco AB, AB SKF, Roxtec AB, Anocca AB and IFN. He is a Director of Investor AB.

He is a former chairman of Orchid Ortopedics, Nikkarit Oy, and CTEK AB, vice chair of Stora Enso Oyj and Vice Preses of the Royal Swedish Academy of Engineering Sciences. Stråberg was European Co-chair of TABD, the Transatlantic Business Dialogue, 2013–2014. He was previously a board member of the Confederation of Swedish Enterprise, Vice President of the Confederation of Engineering Industries, Nederman AB and Mellby Gård AB.

Furthermore, he has been instrumental in the start-up of the non-profit organization SIFE in Sweden in 2004 and its chairman since its inception and in subsequent entrepreneurial organization Business Challenge SBC.

== Awards ==
Commander in the Order of Leopold II, HM the King of Belgium (2006)

- H.M. King of Sweden Gold Medal of 12th size in serafimerorderns tape (2015)
- Member of the Royal Swedish Academy of Engineering Sciences (2006).
- Lucia Trade Award, the Swedish-American Chamber of Commerce, New York (2016).
- Chair of the Year Sweden 2016.
- Gustaf Dalén medal, Chalmers University of Technology
- Golden Gavel 2019 (Atlas Copco) from the Swedish Academy for Board Directors
- The Mekanprisma Award (2025)

== Family ==
Hans Stråberg was born in Västervik, Sweden. He is married to Elizabeth and has two children.
