= Desoutter Mk.II =

British monoplane

Desoutter
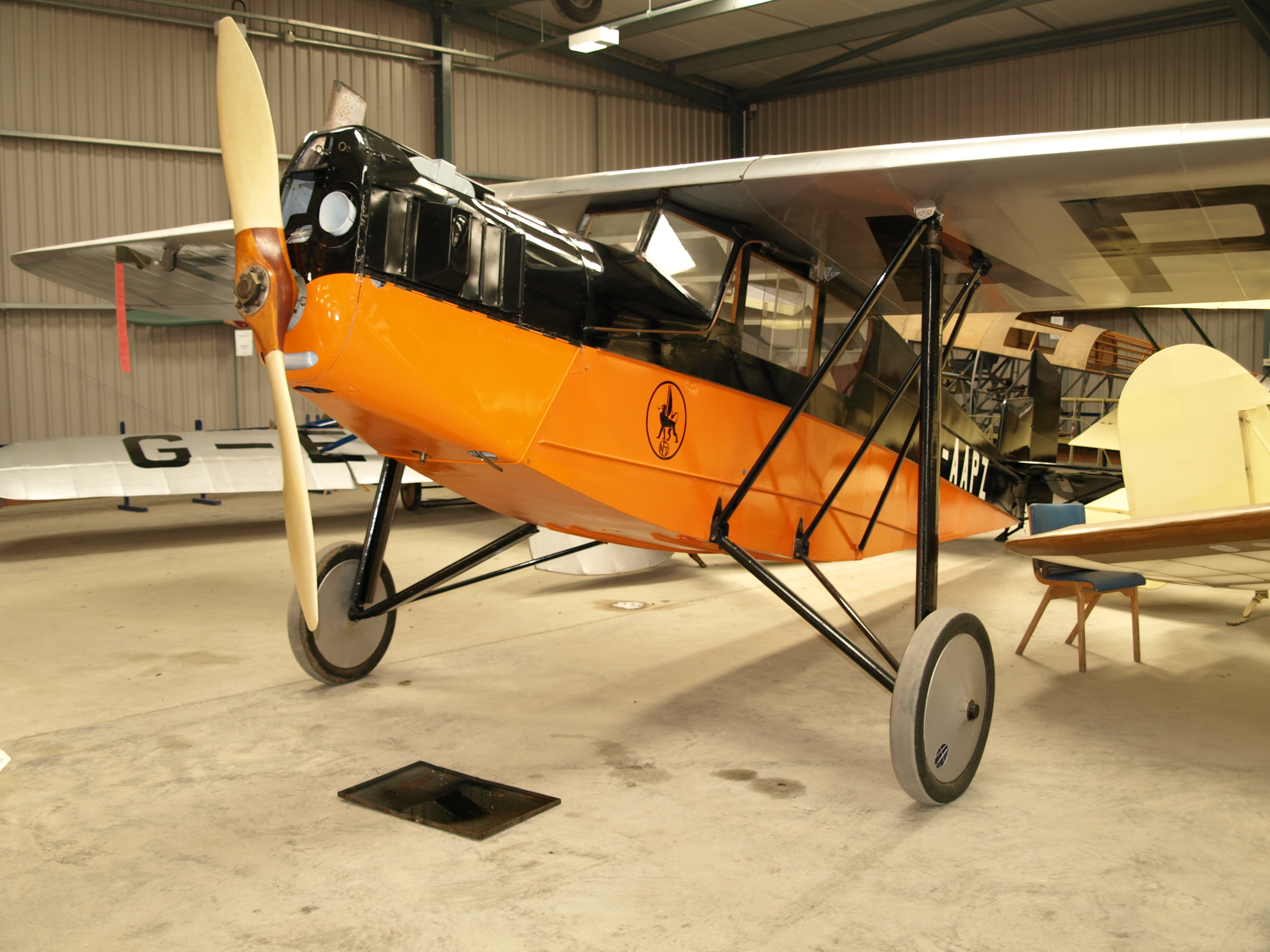
- Desoutter Mk.I at the Shuttleworth Collection

General information
- Type: Liaison
- Manufacturer: Desoutter Aircraft Company/Koolhoven
- Designer: Frederick Koolhoven
- Status: Three known survivors
- Primary users: National Flying Services Ltd Finnish Air Force
- Number built: F.K.41: 6 Mk.I: 28; Mk.II: 13

History
- Introduction date: 1930
- First flight: 1930

Desoutter is a British monoplane liaison aircraft manufactured by Desoutter Aircraft Company at Croydon Aerodrome, Surrey.

== Design and production ==
In the late 1920s, Marcel Desoutter, a well known pilot, formed the Desoutter Aircraft Company Ltd to follow up his marketing idea to licence manufacture the Dutch aircraft Koolhoven F.K.41. This aircraft had drawn a lot of attention due to its modern design. The licence was obtained and Desoutter began production at Croydon Aerodrome in the former ADC Aircraft factory.

The second production Dutch F.K.41 (registered G-AAGC) was flown to Croydon and was modified by Desoutter and displayed at the Olympia Aero Show, London in July 1929 as the Desoutter Dolphin. This aircraft was later sold in South Africa with registration ZS-ADX and was impressed into service with the South African Air Force.

The name Dolphin was not used again and the British production aircraft was known as the Desoutter and then following the introduction of an improved version the following year the Desoutter I. The National Flying Services Ltd placed a large order and received 19 aircraft. These were all painted black and bright orange and soon became a familiar sight at British flying clubs, where they were used for instruction, pleasure flights and taxi flights. The first aircraft for another customer left Croydon for New Zealand on 9 February 1930. It was flown to Sydney, Australia arriving on 13 March 1930, it was then shipped to New Zealand.

In 1930 an improved version, the Desoutter II was produced. It had a de Havilland Gipsy III engine, redesigned ailerons and tail surfaces and wheel brakes.

== Operational history ==
=== Production ===
41 aircraft were built at Croydon Aerodrome – 28 Mk.Is and 13 Mk.IIs, in contrast only six of the original F.K.41 were produced.

=== New Zealand ===
The Desoutter also became famous due to its involvement in New Zealand's first commercial air disaster, which occurred six days after the 1931 Hawke's Bay earthquake on 8 February 1931 near Wairoa. The Desoutter belonged to Dominion Airways and carried the identification code ZK-ACA. The small airliner had been making three round trips a day between Hastings and Gisborne, carrying passengers and supplies. All three on board were killed.

=== Australia ===
Late in 1931 Australians H. Jenkins and H. Jeffrey purchased the 30th production aircraft EI-AAD from Irish owners Iona National Air Taxis and flew it as G-ABOM from Heston Aerodrome to Sydney between 29 December 1931 and February 1932. Here it was soon sold to L. MacKenzie Johnson as VH-UEE Miss Flinders who began a regular service between Launceston and Whitemark on Flinders Island, most of the 108-mile route being over the waters of south-eastern Bass Strait. Competition with regular shipping services by William Holyman & Sons saw the formation of Holymans Airways, the forerunners of Australian National Airways, later the same year. VH-UEE has been preserved by the Queen Victoria Museum in Launceston.

Three other Desoutter IIs were purchased by Hart Aviation Services of Melbourne, including the still-extant VH-UPR (damaged in an accident on Deal Island in Bass Strait in 1933). VH-UPR is now located at the Nhill aerodrome in country Victoria.

=== Denmark ===
The Danish Air Society (Det Danske Luftfartselskab) bought the second last manufactured Desoutter Mk.II in 1931. This aircraft was given the registration OY-DOD. In 1934, this aircraft was sold to lieutenant Michael Hansen, and in the following year to the Nordisk Luftrafik company. In 1938 it was sold to Nordjysk Aero Service, but Michael Hansen bought the aircraft back the same year and used it to fly to Cape Town and in the MacRobertson Air Race. The aircraft completed the journey from Mildenhall, England to Melbourne, Australia in 129 Hours 47 Minutes, it gained 7th position in the handicap race.

=== Finland ===
During the Winter War, the Red Cross of Denmark raised money in order to purchase an ambulance aircraft for Finland. In October 1941 the Danish aircraft registered OY-DOD was bought for this purpose and was donated to Finland. The aircraft was flown by Michael Hansen to Helsinki, Finland on 28 October 1941. The Mk.II was given both Finnish Air Force and Red Cross markings and was used until 14 November 1944 as a liaison and ambulance aircraft. After the war, the Karhumäki brothers, who were aircraft manufacturers, bought the aircraft and sold it without the engine to Torsti Tallgren and Armas Jylhä in Tampere, who repaired it and registered it as OH-TJA on 17 November 1947. The aircraft crashed near Tampere on 4 December 1947.

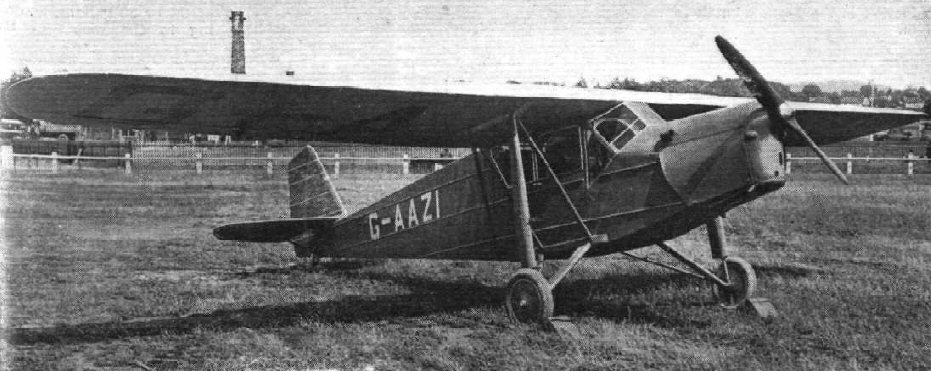
Desoutter Mk.II

== Variants ==
Koolhoven F.K.41
Original Dutch version, six built, powered variously by 90 hp (67 kW) ADC Cirrus, 100 hp (75 kW) Siemens-Halske Sh 11, or any suitable engine in the 60–100 hp (45–75 kW) range
Desoutter Dolphin
One Desoutter modified F.K.41
Desoutter Mk.I
(previously known as the Desoutter for a few months) – British licence-made version. Modified tail, powered by Cirrus Hermes engine, 28 built.
Desoutter Mk.II
(Sports Coupé) Modified version of the Mk.I with new inverted engine, redesigned vertical rudder and windscreen, 13 built.

== Surviving aircraft ==
Three of the 41 aircraft survive:

- G-AAPZ a flyable Desoutter I is operated by the Shuttleworth Trust, Old Warden, England.
- VH-UEE is on display at Launceston Airport in Tasmania.
- VH-UPR is a flyable Desoutter II owned by the Australian National Aviation Museum in Melbourne Australia

== Operators ==
=== Civil operators ===
Argentina
Australia
Belgium
Canada
Denmark
The Danish airliner Det Danske Luftfarssselskab (DDL; 1932–1934; OY-DOD)
Netherlands
Dutch East Indies
Ireland
Finland
Hungary
India
New Zealand
South Africa
United Kingdom

=== Military operators ===
Finland
Finnish Air Force (Desoutter II, ex-Danish OY-DOD given by the Danish Red Cross)
South Africa
South African Air Force (F.K.41)
United Kingdom
Royal Air Force (Desoutter I and II)

== Specifications (Mk.II) ==
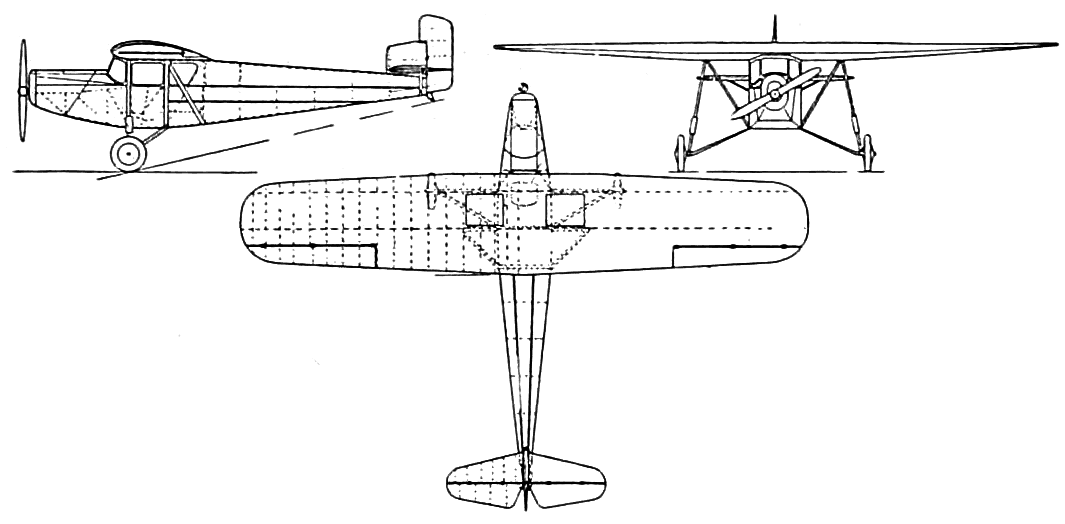
Desoutter I 3-view drawing from Aero Digest January,1930

Data from Jackson

General characteristics

- Crew: 1
- Capacity: 2 pax
- Length: 25 ft 11 in (7.9 m)
- Wingspan: 35 ft 9 in (10.9 m)
- Height: 7 ft 1 in (2.15 m)
- Wing area: 191 sq ft (17.7 m^{2})
- Empty weight: 1,182 lb (536 kg)
- Max takeoff weight: 1,903 lb (863 kg)
- Powerplant: 1 × de Havilland Gipsy III 4-cylinder air-cooled in-line piston engine, 120 hp (89 kW)
- Propellers: 2-bladed fixed pitch propeller

Performance

- Maximum speed: 125 mph (201 km/h, 109 kn)
- Cruise speed: 99 mph (159 km/h, 86 kn)
- Stall speed: 46 mph (74 km/h, 40 kn)
- Range: 500 mi (800 km, 430 nmi)
- Service ceiling: 17,100 ft (5,200 m)
- Rate of climb: 1,000 ft/min (5.08 m/s)

== See also ==
Aircraft of comparable role, configuration, and era

- de Havilland Puss Moth
- PWS-52

Related lists

- List of aircraft of the Royal Air Force
