= Desoutter Aircraft Company =

English aircraft manufacturer, 1928–1932

- Industry: Aerospace
- Founded: 1928
- Defunct: 1932
- Fate: Ceased trading
- Headquarters: Croydon, Surrey, England

The Desoutter Aircraft Company was a British aircraft manufacturer based in Croydon. It was founded by Marcel Desoutter and produced aircraft during the late 1920s and the 1930s.

== History ==
The company was formed in December 1928 to manufacture the designs of the Dutch Koolhoven company in particular the Koolhoven F.K.41, which had drawn a lot of attention due to its modern design. The licence was obtained and Desoutter set up a production unit at the former ADC factory at Croydon Aerodrome. The F.K.41 became quite successful and was marketed under the name Dolphin. The name "Dolphin" was later dropped and for a while the aircraft was marketed only under the name "Desoutter". A slightly modified version was later produced and the versions received the suffixes Mk.I and Mk.II.

Desoutter's aircraft became a familiar sight in British flying clubs, where they were used for instruction, pleasure flights and taxi flights.

The business folded in 1932 after its main customer, National Flying Services at London Air Park, Hanworth, went into liquidation, having produced 41 aircraft (twenty-eight Mk.Is and thirteen Mk.IIs).

== Aircraft ==
- Desoutter Mk.I previously also known as "Dolphin" or simply only as "Desoutter"
- Desoutter Mk.II Sports Coupé

== See also ==
- List of aircraft manufacturers
