= MV Seashell =

Coaster, built 1943

History
- Name: Glücksburg (1943-44); Stadt Glücksburg (1944-45); Empire Condart (1945-47); Fredor (1947-57); Seashell (1957-68)
- Owner: H C Hern (1944-45); Ministry of War Transport (1945); Ministry of Transport (1945-47); Plym Shipping Co (1947-57); Instone Lines Ltd (1957-68)
- Operator: H C Hern (1944-45); Ministry of War Transport (1945); Ministry of Transport (1945-47); Plym Shipping Co (1947-57); Instone Lines Ltd (1957-68)
- Port of registry: (Nazi Germany) Kriegsmarine (1943-45); (Nazi Germany) Hamburg (1945); (United Kingdom) London (1945-47); (United Kingdom) Plymouth (1947-55); (United Kingdom) London (1955-68)
- Builder: Lidingö Nya Varv & Vaerkstaeder AB
- Launched: 1943
- Fate: Scrapped 1968

General characteristics
- Type: Coaster
- Tonnage: 312 GRT (1943-52); 452 GRT (1952-68)
- Length: 144 ft 0 in (43.89 m)
- Beam: 26 ft 2 in (7.98 m)
- Depth: 12 ft 5 in (3.78 m)
- Installed power: 2SCSA diesel engine
- Propulsion: Screw propeller

Seashell was a 312 GRT coaster that was built in 1943 by Lidingö Nya Varv & Vaerkstaeder, Lidingö, Sweden for German owners. She was seized by the Allies at Hamburg and passed to the Ministry of War Transport (MoWT) and renamed Empire Condart. In 1947, she was sold into merchant service and was renamed Fredor. In 1952, she was lengthened, with her GRT rising to 452. A sale in 1955 saw her renamed Seashell. She served until 1968 when she was scrapped.

== Description ==
The ship was built in 1943 by Lidingö Nya Varv & Vaerkstaeder AB, Lidingö, Sweden.

The ship was 144 feet 0 inches (43.89 m) long, with a beam of 26 feet 2 inches (7.98 m) a depth of 12 feet 5 inches (3.78 m). As built, she had a GRT of 312.

The ship was propelled by a 2-stroke Single Cycle Single Acting diesel engine, which had 6 cylinders of 9 13/16 inches (24.9 cm) diameter by 16 9/16 inches (42.1 cm) stroke. The engine was built by AB Atlas Diesel, Stockholm.

== History ==
Glücksburg was built for H C Horn, Hamburg. She was requisitioned by the Kriegsmarine on completion. In 1944, she was renamed Stadt Glücksburg. In 1945, she was returned to Horn's. In May 1945, she was seized by the Allies at Hamburg. She was passed to the MoWT and was renamed Empire Condart.

In 1947, she was sold to the Plym Shipping Co Ltd, Plymouth and was renamed Fredor. In 1952, she was lengthened, raising her to 452 GRT. In 1957, she was sold to Instone Lines Ltd, London and was renamed Seashell. She served until 1968 when she was scrapped at Tamise, Belgium.
