= Edmond Michel =

- Born: 1885-1886; France
- Died: December 25, 1962 (aged 76); Chicago, Illinois, United States
- Education: Sorbonne University
- Occupations: Electrical engineer, inventor

Edmond Michel was a French-born American electrical engineer and inventor. He is credited with inventing the handheld circular saw. (Note: Tabitha Babbitt is credited with inventing the first circular saw for use in a saw mill in 1813.) He was also the co-founder of Skil.

== Personal life ==
Born in France, Michel immigrated to the United States sometime during the early 20th century. Initially living in Houma, Louisiana, he would later move to New Orleans.

== Career ==
Prior to the popularization of power tools, agricultural tasks that involved cutting through thick materials such as sugarcane had to be done with the use of machetes, which often required tedious labor. In 1921, After he had watched sugar farmers cut through thick cane stalks with them, Michel sought to develop a motorized version of the machete.

Initially, Michel mounted a mixer motor onto a standard machete, as well as a worm wheel gearbox and a 2-inch circular blade. This invention, while working fairly effectively, required an external generator, making it impractical for use. In creating this device, Michel effectively created an early example of a motorized worm drive. Michel then tried again, using a piece of wood with a notch carved into it. In the notch, he mounted the same mechanism as the mechanical reaper, but with a 6-inch blade. This was the first electric circular saw.

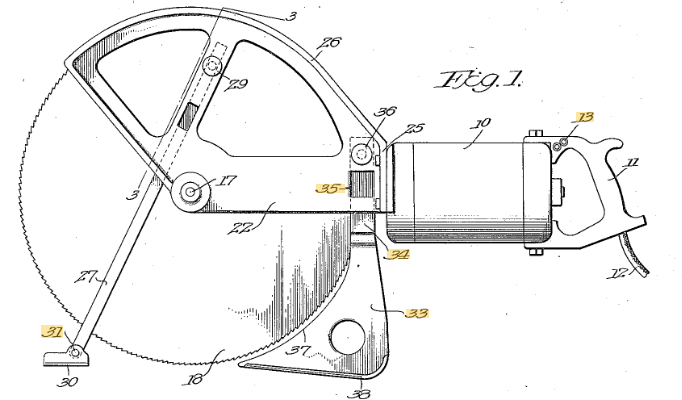
Patent drawing for the first Michel Electric Hand Saw, in 1924

After a New Orleans newspaper ran an article about Michel's invention, he was approached by Joseph W. Sullivan. The two became business partners and moved to Chicago. In January 1924, they were granted a patent for the hand saw, with the Michel Electric Hand Saw Company being established in June of that year. Despite attracting immediate interest from contractors despite numerous mechanical problems, the two began production of the tool. The name of the company was renamed to Skil in 1926, after Sullivan's wife commented on the skill necessary to use one. Michel had reportedly been the person to coin the term "Skilsaw", which would become the trademarked name for the saws produced by the company.

Just before the Great Depression, Michel withdrew from the company to work on new inventions. After leaving Skil, Michel invested his share of the money inventing and developing the "Larmloc", the first keypad-based lock. This invention failed to pan out, and only one working prototype was ever made.
