= Skilsaw =

Brand name of professional construction tools

SKILSAW
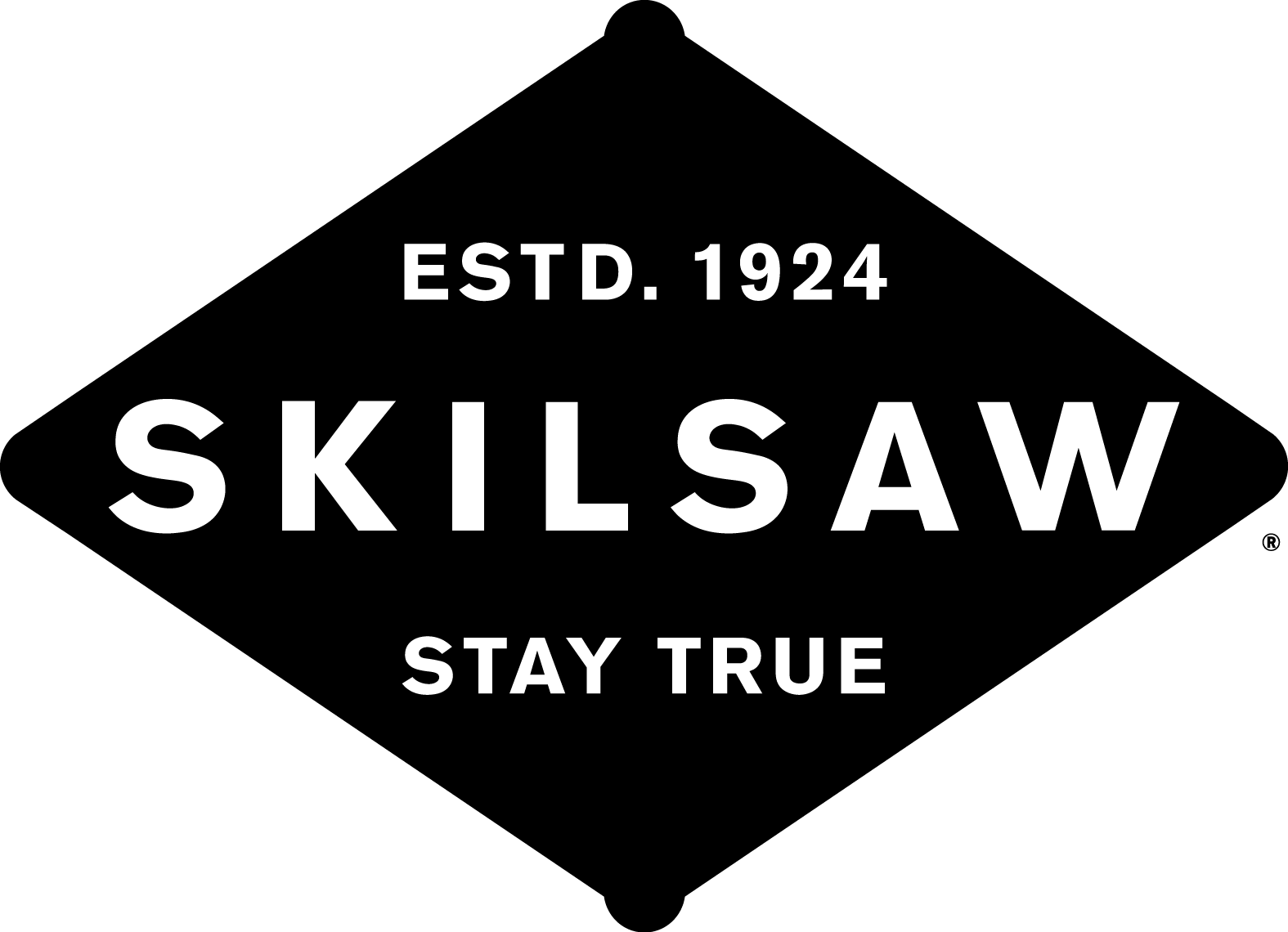
- Company type: Subsidiary
- Industry: Manufacturing
- Founded: 1924
- Headquarters: Naperville, IL
- Products: Power tools
- Parent: Chervon Ltd.
- Website: www.skilsaw.com

SKILSAW Power Tools is a manufacturer of circular saw-cutting technology serving the professional construction market. Since 2017, SKILSAW's headquarters has been located in Naperville, Illinois.

== History ==
SKILSAW was founded in 1924 by Edmond Michel and Joseph W. Sullivan. Originally dubbed "The Michel Electric Handsaw Company," the company was renamed to SKILSAW Incorporated in 1926 after Michel left. In 1928, the SKILSAW Model E was invented by Art Emmons. The Model E was equipped with an 8-inch blade and was the world’s first portable circular saw. This saw's invention also spurred the use of worm drive gearing, a dual-field motor, and die-cast aluminum motor housing. In 1937, its successor, the SKILSAW Model 77, became the benchmark of portable saws, along with the SKILSAW Model 87 circular saws, and it continues to be used on job sites across the United States.

During the post-war era, the company expanded and began producing bench top tools and tools for a do-it-yourself audience. The company name was changed from SKILSAW Inc. to SKIL Corporation in 1952. Then, in November 2014, SKIL rebranded, making SKILSAW the brand serving the professional construction market and SKIL the brand serving the consumer do-it-yourself market.

Since rebranding, SKILSAW has introduced a variety of new professional-grade saws for cutting both wood and other materials commonly used on job sites. The initial product lineup following the rebrand featured SKILSAW's pro grade, Sidewinder circular saws. Additionally, their larger worm drive saw called the "SawSquatch" was the first 10-1/4-inch worm drive saw. The following year, 2016, brought three new metal cutting saws, including the first 8-inch worm drive optimized for metal, a 12-inch dry cut saw and a 14-inch abrasive chop saw. In addition to metal cutting, SKILSAW also announced a saw for fiber cement in 2015 and the first worm drive saw for concrete in 2016. Both of these saws were developed to meet new OSHA guidelines that protect workers from respirable silica dust. The company also expanded beyond traditional circular saws with the first worm drive table saw in 2016 and two reciprocating saws in 2017.

== Products ==
SKILSAW’s product lineup includes worm drive saws, SIDEWINDER-branded circular saws and benchtop saws for various materials including wood, metal, fiber cement and concrete. In 2017, SKILSAW expanded its product offering from circular to linear cutting with its first reciprocating saws since rebranding.

== Ownership history ==
In 1991, the Emerson Electric Company and Robert Bosch GmbH entered into a joint venture by combining their power tool subsidiaries. In 1992, the new venture came to fruition as S-B Power Tool Co. In 1996, after four years of the partnership, Robert Bosch GmbH took over complete ownership of Skil.

On August 23, 2016, Chervon (HK) Ltd., a global power tool manufacturer based out of China, acquired the SKILSAW brand from Robert Bosch Tool Corporation, which gave them control over the SKIL businesses in both North America and the European market.

== Genericized Trademark ==
In the United States, the term "Skilsaw" has become a genericized trademark, commonly used to refer to any handheld circular saw, regardless of the actual brand. According to the Oxford English Dictionary (OED), the term "Skilsaw" originated in the 1920s, with the earliest evidence dating back to 1925 in the *Official Gazette*. The OED notes that "Skilsaw" is formed by compounding the words "skill" and "saw" and is primarily used in North American English.

This generic usage stems from the significant impact of the original Skilsaw, which was among the first portable circular saws introduced in the 1920s. The widespread adoption of Skilsaw's design and the brand's prominence in the market led to its name becoming synonymous with handheld circular saws in general.
