= Quasi-Arc Company =

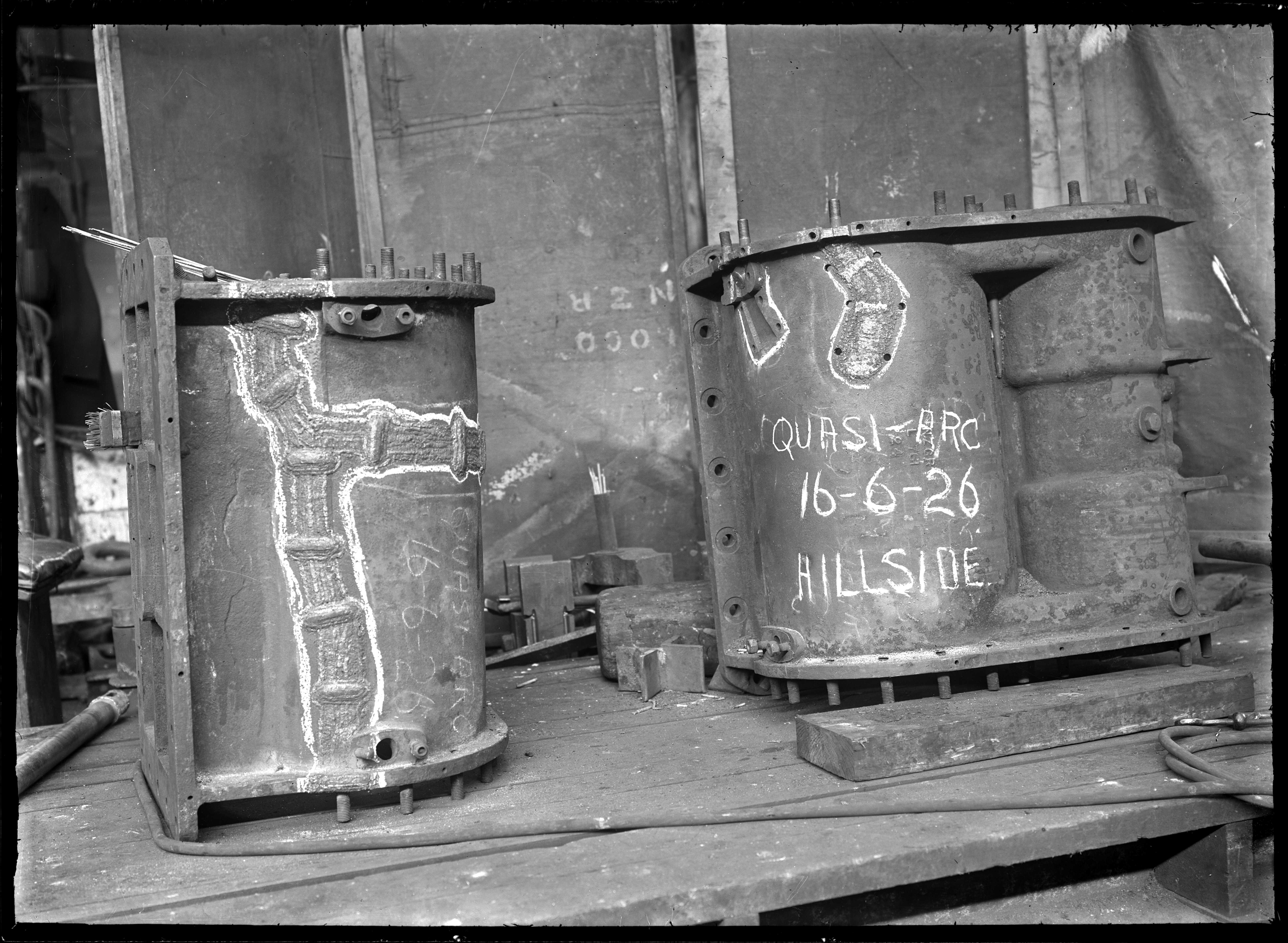
Locomotive cylinders welded by quasi-arc process at Hillside Engineering in New Zealand on 16 June 1926

The Quasi-Arc Company was a provider of arc welding equipment and consumables.

The company was founded around 1911 by William Lawes Cole, Arthur P. Strohmenger and C. H. Champness. Its head office was in Grosvenor Gardens, London. The factory was initially in Mile End, London, and in 1939 one opened in Bilston.

The Fullagar, the world's first fully welded ocean-going vessel, was built from 1917 to 1920 using the Quaisi-Arc system at the Cammell, Laird & Company shipyard in Birkenhead.

In 1930 the company was bought by Turner and Newall. In 1932 it supplied electrodes made from blue asbestos. The asbestos covered electrodes were easy to use, and thus the Quasi-Arc Company influenced the development and practical applications of arc welding. In its own welding school it educated users how to weld with them. In 1959 it was taken over by the Electric Welding Division of the British Oxygen Company (BOC). In 1961 it produced and sold electrodes, equipment and installations for manual, semi-automatic and fully automatic arc welding. In 1968 the Bilston plant was closed and production concentrated at Waltham Cross.

== Patents ==
- Musto Romeo Jose, Quasi Arc Co Ltd: Electric arc welding plant. US1810251A. Priority date 20 September 1928. Grant date 16 June 1931.
