= BOC (company) =

British industrial gas company

BOC Limited
- Formerly: BOC Group plc; British Oxygen Company; Brin's Oxygen Company
- Type: Subsidiary
- Industry: Industrial gas
- Founded: 1886
- Headquarters: Woking, England, UK
- Number of employees: 30,000 (2005)
- Parent: Linde plc
- Website: Official website

BOC Limited is a British based multinational, industrial gas company based in Woking, England. Since 2006, it has been a subsidiary of Linde plc.

== History ==
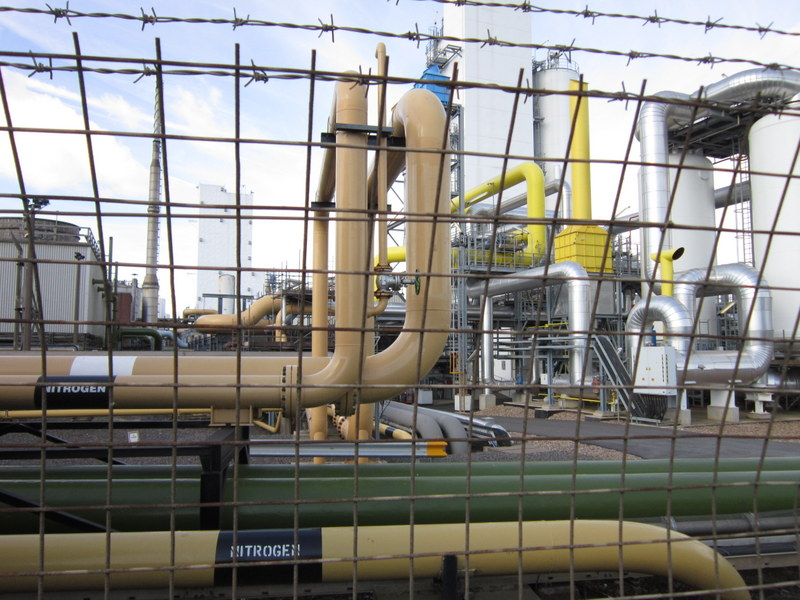
BOC Scunthorpe, 2012

Brin's Oxygen Company was formed in 1886, by two French brothers, Arthur and Léon Brin. In the early years, the company manufactured oxygen using a high-temperature barium oxide process, known as the Brin process, developed from the work of French scientist Jean-Baptiste Boussingault. The main application for gaseous oxygen at that time was in connection with the generation of limelight, used in magic lanterns and theatre lighting. BOC was the first company to produce oxygen on a commercial scale, and initially found it difficult to find customers outside of the limelight lighting sector.

Around 1903, a major new market emerged via the development of the oxyacetylene welding process. Around the same time, new cryogenic air separation processes had been devised independently in the UK, the United States and Germany. The German engineer and founder of the Linde Group, Carl von Linde, was awarded the patent for the process. The Brin brothers negotiated an agreement to use the Linde patents. In exchange, von Linde was given a stake and a board position in Brin's Oxygen Company, which he held until 1914. The new process replaced the inefficient barium oxide process, paving the way for larger-scale and more efficient production.

In 1906, the Brin brothers renamed the company the British Oxygen Company (BOC). During the First World War, the business increased significantly as the mass production of needed war machinery—ships, tanks and trucks—involved either metal cutting or welding. It was amid this conflict that a gentleman's agreement was struck between BOC and the French industrial gas producer Air Liquide, under which both companies agreed to stay out of the home markets of one another; this arrangement effectively remained in place until the 1960s.

At the end of the First World War, BOC did not produce any acetylene; during the interwar period, the firm chose to enter this market via cooperation with Allen-Liversidge Ltd, which it opted to acquire outright in 1930. During this year, BOC completed several other acquisitions, including of Sparklets Ltd and the Quasi-Arc Company. During the early 1930s, a potential domestic competitor in the form of Oxygen Industries Ltd had secured the rights to new liquid oxygen production techniques; BOC's response was to initially file a law suit and then complete a take over of the firm in 1933. Around this time, BOC was highly profitable and demonstrated a preference for purchasing access to new technologies developed in nations such as France and Germany in place of internal development efforts; it also made limited diversification efforts into raw materials for its core products, such as calcium carbide extraction activities in Norway (used to produce acetylene).

During the Second World War, BOC expanded its production as a key supplier of gases for both munitions and medical needs. After the conflict, BOC formed subsidiaries in over twenty countries. In 1956, the UK's Monopolies Commission determined that the company controlled 98.5 percent of the markets for both oxygen and acetylene at home, dominating the supply of such gases throughout the British Empire. In the following years, restrictions were enacted on BOC aimed at increasing competition.

Throughout the 1960s and 1970s, BOC opted to diversify into numerous other industrial sectors. One was the refrigeration market; to this end, it set up a joint venture with the German industrial gas specialist Linde called BOC-Linde Refrigeration in 1968. It also acquired Ace Refrigeration Ltd and J. Muirhead Ltd, quick-frozen food suppliers, in 1969.

With the plan of expanding into the Far East, it set up British Oxygen (Far East) Ltd, based in Tokyo. It established subsidiaries and joint ventures in Jamaica, the Netherlands, South Africa, Sweden and Spain for a number of products; which included transformers, magnetising equipment, frozen foods, stable isotopes, radioactively labelled compounds and cryogenic systems. In 1971, the company installed the largest mainframe computer in the UK, linking a network of computers throughout the country, and sold computer time to outside customers. As a result, BOC diversified into the computer business.

The 1973 oil crisis led to a rethinking of BOC's future strategy. It divested non-strategic assets; and concentrated on its primary business, especially the gases and health care markets, and the expansion of these businesses to Europe, the Americas and the Far East. In March 1975, the company became BOC International, reflecting its success in developing business outside of Britain, and in products beyond oxygen.

In 1978, BOC purchased an 34% stake in Airco Industrial Gases, an American competitor, for the price of $20 per share. It acquired the remainder in 1978 for $50 per share. The takeover was approved by the US Supreme Court in 1977, following anti-trust action by the US government.

In 1999, reports emerged that the U.S. industrial gases company Praxair, which in 1992 spun off from Linde's U.S. division, 'Union Carbide Industrial Gases', were in possible merger discussions with BOC. Following the breakup of the talks, France's Air Liquide and Air Products & Chemicals made a series of cash offers to acquire the group. On 13 July 1999, the BOC board approved a pre-conditional cash offer of £14.60 per share. BOC's assets were to be divided between Air Liquide and Air Products in the US$11 billion deal. On 12 May 2000, the bid lapsed, following failure to reach a satisfactory agreement with the United States Federal Trade Commission (FTC).

Following the collapse of the bid, BOC developed a new strategy to stimulate business growth in new products and markets and to reshape its existing portfolio of businesses to improve Group performance. In 2001, BOC announced it was cutting 1,500 jobs in spite of increased productivity at the firm having been recorded. In late 2002, the company merged its Japanese industrial and medical gas businesses with those of Air Liquide to form Japan Air Gases. Separately, BOC also acquired Praxair's operations in Poland that same year.

In November 2003, BOC announced that it would complete the sale of Afrox Healthcare, a hospital and managed health care group operating in South Africa, to a consortium led by Black Economic Empowerment investors.

The BOC's total revenues in 2005, including its share of joint ventures and associate companies, were £4.6 billion and was then the second largest industrial gas supplier in the world. Industrial gases business made up for more than 80% of sales. The group was getting nearly one-third of its revenues from Asia Pacific; Europe accounted for 28% and the Americas 27%.

In January 2006, the Linde Group made a preliminary proposal to acquire BOC based on a £15 per share all-cash offer, which was rejected by the BOC board of directors. In March 2006, the second proposal based on a £16 per share all-cash offer, valuing the company at £8.2bn (US$14.4bn; €12bn), was accepted and takeover was completed on 5 September 2006. Regulatory approval, such as from the FTC and the European Commission, was also secured. Accordingly, after nearly a century of intermittent courtship, BOC became a part of Linde Group and the synergy overtook Air Liquide as the global market leader. On 6 September 2006, to mark the completion of the acquisition, BOC employees received a welcome pack including a letter from Linde CEO Wolfgang Reitzle, a small badge representing the new logo of The Linde Group and a Swatch watch.

On 12 March 2007, the Linde Group divested the vacuum business known as BOC Edwards to the private investment group CCMP Capital.

== Operations ==
The BOC business activities included:

- The Process Gas Solutions (PGS) line of business, supplying large product volumes by pipeline, on-site generation or cryogenic tanker
- The Industrial and Special Products (ISP) line of business providing packaged gas, chemicals and related products and services. The gases involved are typically delivered in high pressure cylinders and range from technical grades to high-purity speciality gases.
- BOC Edwards supplying the semiconductor industry with vacuum, chemical delivery and abatement systems and related services. It also supplies vacuum equipment to many industrial and scientific sectors.
- Gist Limited provided logistics services, transport and warehousing to a number of sectors including food, beverage and fashion retail for large corporations including Marks & Spencer, Waitrose and Tesco. It was bought by M&S in Summer 2022 as part of a deal worth up to £255M.

== Headquarters ==
When BOC was a global company, the head office of BOC was in Windlesham, a small village approximately 25 miles south-west of London. The office, built in the 1980s is a fine example of modern architecture and when seen from the air resembles the shape of an oxygen molecule. This office was used by Kamkorp Group and then stood empty before being sold to Gordon Murray Automotive in February 2020. Many of the staff that was based in the Windlesham office have since moved to the BOC office in Woking and Linde plc's head office in Munich, Germany.

== Coat of Arms ==
BOC was granted a coat of arms by the College of Arms in 1961.

Coat of arms of British Oxygen Company Limited

Adopted
5 April 1961
Crest
Issuant from a crown of rays gules, a demi lion Or holding in the paws a vine branch slipped, leaved and fructed, proper.
Escutcheon
Gules, two bars nebuly and a bordure nebuly argent.
Supporters
On either side a lion Or, the head rayonee gules, holding aloft in the interior paw a staff of Aesculapis sable, the serpent vert purfied gold.
Motto
Auris vitalibus vesci

== See also ==
- BOC Covent Garden Festival
