= Atlas Copco =

Swedish multinational industrial company

Atlas Copco Group

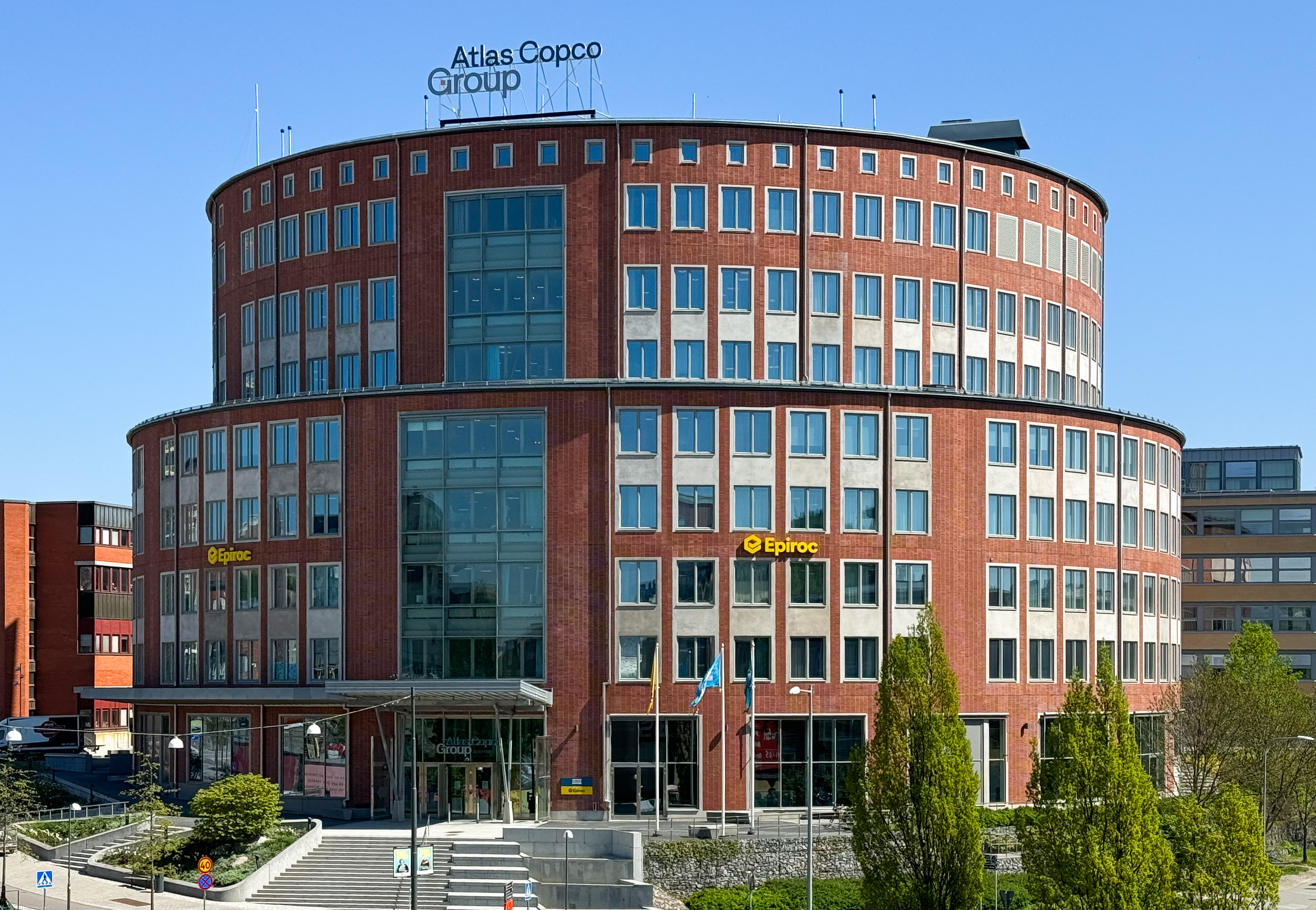
- Atlas Copco Group headquarters in Sickla
- Type: Publicly traded aktiebolag
- Traded as: Nasdaq Stockholm: ATCO A, ATCO B
- ISIN: SE0017486889; SE0017486897
- Industry: Industrial equipment
- Founded: 1873; 153 years ago
- Founder: Edvard Fränckel
- Headquarters: Nacka, Stockholm County, Sweden
- Key people: Hans Stråberg (Chairman), Vagner Rego (President and CEO)
- Products: Air and gas treatment equipment; Assembly equipment; Energy storage; Exhaust management equipment; Expanders; Generators; Industrial compressors; Industrial power tools; Machine vision; Mobile compressors; Pumps; Quality assurance equipment; Vacuum equipment; Valves
- Brands: Atlas Copco; BeaconMedaes; Chicago Pneumatic; Desoutter Edwards; Henrob; Leybold; Nano-Purification Solutions; Quincy Compressor; SCA
- Revenue: ▼168.343 billion kr (2025)
- Operating income: ▼34.114 billion kr (2025)
- Net income: ▼26.425 billion kr (2025)
- Total assets: ▼202.454 billion kr (2025)
- Total equity: ▼110.383 billion kr (2025)
- Number of employees: 56,413 (end of 2025)
- Website: www.atlascopcogroup.com

Atlas Copco Group (Copco from Compagnie Pneumatique Commerciale) is a Swedish multinational industrial company. It manufactures compressors, vacuum equipment, pumps, generators, assembly tools, quality assurance equipment and other products and systems for industrial applications and mobile power generation. The products are sold in around 180 countries.

The company was founded in 1873 in Stockholm. By the end of 2025, the number of employees was around 56,000 and the yearly revenue 168 billion kr. Atlas Copco is listed on the Nasdaq Stockholm exchange, and its A and B classes of shares are both constituents of the OMXS30 index. The head office is in Nacka, near central Stockholm, on a site where the main factory of the company used to be located.

== History ==
=== Early development ===
The company AB Atlas, as it was first named, was founded in 1873 by Edvard Fränckel, who was a Swedish industrialist, politician and senior official at the Swedish State Railways. Early investors were Andre O. Wallenberg and David O. Francke. Johan W. Arnberg, Carl G. Cervin and Fredrik Didron also contributed to the establishment of the company.

Initially, the company produced railway equipment, including railway carriages, in factories in Stockholm and Södertälje. After some profitable years, a general recession in the 1880s induced heavy losses and prompted a diversification into steel and iron parts for general construction purposes, as well as marine steam engines and boilers. Manufacturing was eventually concentrated to Stockholm. In 1890, the company was reconstructed as Nya AB Atlas (the New Atlas company), with the Wallenberg family as the principal owner and products that included steam engines, locomotives, machine tools and central heating components.

=== 1898 to 1948 ===
In the early 20th century, the focus moved towards oil-driven engines, pneumatic machinery and compressors. By 1915, compressed air products constituted 50 percent of sales. Meanwhile, in 1898, the Wallenberg family had founded the company AB Diesels Motorer to produce engines based on Rudolf Diesel's patent. From early on, there was collaboration between the companies, and in 1917, Nya Atlas merged with Diesels Motorer to form AB Atlas Diesel. The First World War disrupted international sales of compressed air products but provided opportunities for exporting marine diesel engines, mainly to the Allied nations.

The post-war period was characterized by weakening sales, a reduced workforce and financial reorganization. The factory space in central Stockholm was sold and the production of pneumatic equipment moved to the diesel engine factory in the Sickla suburb. By the late 1920s, sales had improved, but the company was nevertheless hit hard by the 1930s depression. However, from the late 1930s, the company was profitable again, and pneumatic tools were the largest driver of growth. The system that was introduced in 1936 and became known as the "Swedish method" was first used at full scale in a Stockholm tunnel in 1945–46; combining lightweight pusher-leg rock drills with tungsten-carbide bits, it allowed one worker to operate one machine and became a foundation of Atlas Diesel's postwar international expansion.

During the Second World War, sales to the Swedish Armed Forces kept the production of diesel engines and hydraulic gears going, but by the end of the war, the focus had decidedly shifted to compressed air products, and in 1948, the diesel engine division was sold off.

=== Post-war international expansion ===
After the war, the company, still called Atlas Diesel although no diesel engines were produced, set up an international sales network and increased its production capacity through domestic acquisitions. In 1956, it did its first significant foreign acquisition, the Belgian compressor company Arpic Engineering NV, and in the same year, the company name was changed to Atlas Copco AB. The word "Copco" was derived from Compagnie Pneumatique Commerciale, a Belgian subsidiary whose name, in its abbreviated form, had been used in several countries. Production was also established in Finland and the UK.

In the 1960s, factories were acquired in several additional countries, and more than 80 percent of sales were outside of Scandinavia. Important products besides rock drilling equipment included portable compressors and pneumatic hand tools. The company decentralized its organization and increased its research and development investments. In 1970, it had 13,000 employees and was present in 34 countries. The 1970s was a continued period of expansion and acquisistions, and sales increased fourfold.

In the 1980s, the international recession prompted the company to close factories and decrease its workforce, but the end of the decade was marked by significant acquisistions in the industrial tools sector, notably Chicago Pneumatic Tool Company in 1987.

In the early 1990s, there was another recession that caused a 30-percent reduction in the number of employees, but there were also significant acquisitions, such as the electric tool makers AEG Elektrowerkzeuge in 1992 and Milwaukee Electric Tool in 1995. In 1997, Atlas Copco entered into the equipment rental market by acquiring the American company Prime Service Corporation, followed by the acquisition of several smaller North American rental businesses and, in 1999, another major rental company, Rental Service Corporation. This made Atlas Copco the second-largest North American equipment rental provider, and in 2000, more than half of the company's sales came from North America.

=== 2000s ===
The early 2000s were marked by challenging market conditions. There were significant acquisitions related to construction and drilling equipment but also efforts to divest businesses related to areas in which the company did not have a strong international position. In 2004, the sale of the electric tool businesses acquired in the 1990s to the Hong Kong-based manufacturer Techtronic Industries was announced, and in 2006, the general equipment rental business was sold to the private equity firms Ripplewood Holdings and Oak Hill Capital Management.

=== 2010s ===
In 2014, Atlas Copco entered the vacuum industry by acquiring the British company Edwards. There was a further expansion into the same area in 2016, through the acquisition of Leybold, founded 1850 in Germany.

==== Split-off of mining and infrastructure equipment business ====
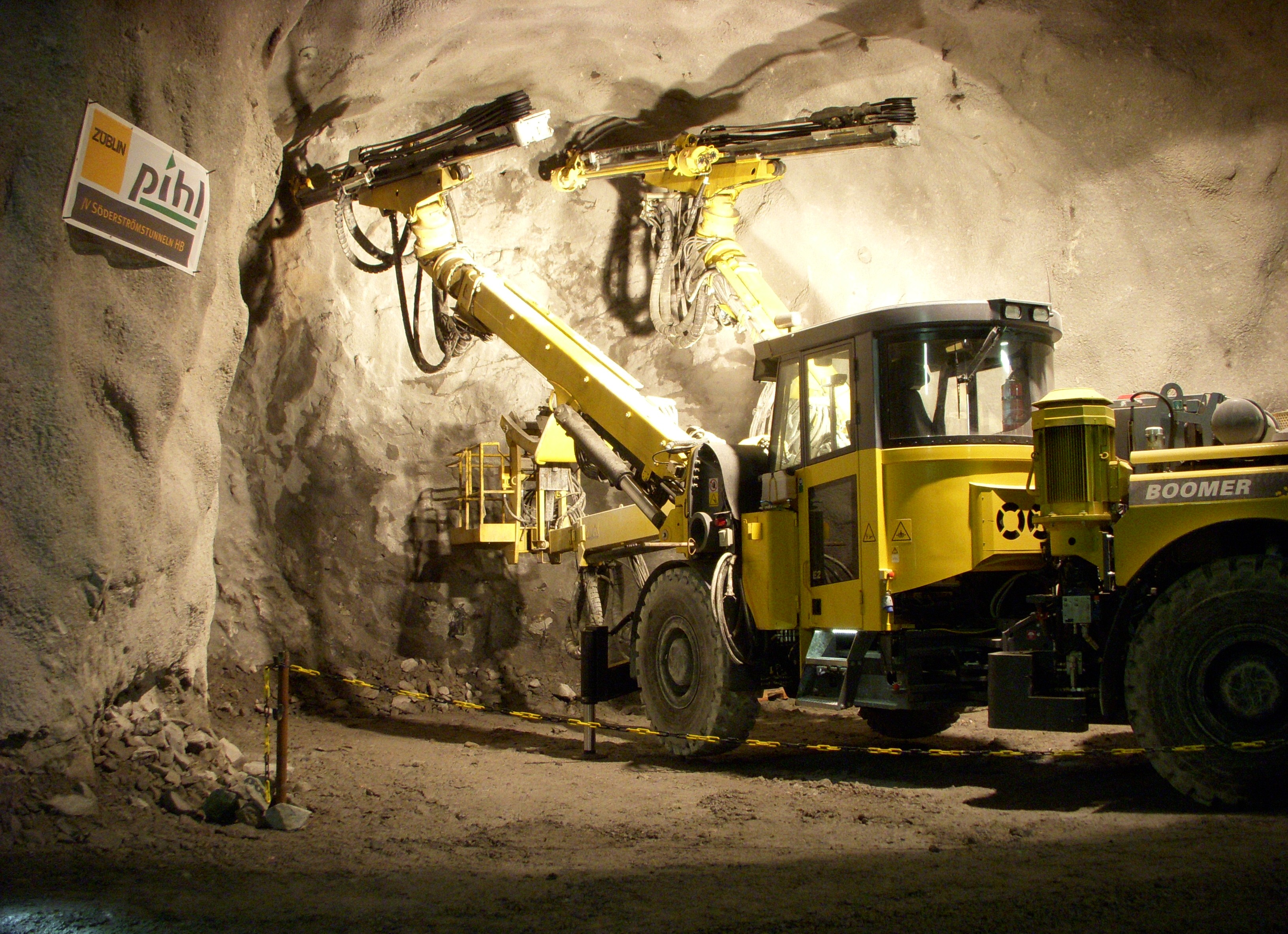
Tunnel drilling machine "Rocket Boomer E2C", model 2009. The rock drilling equipment business belongs to Epiroc.

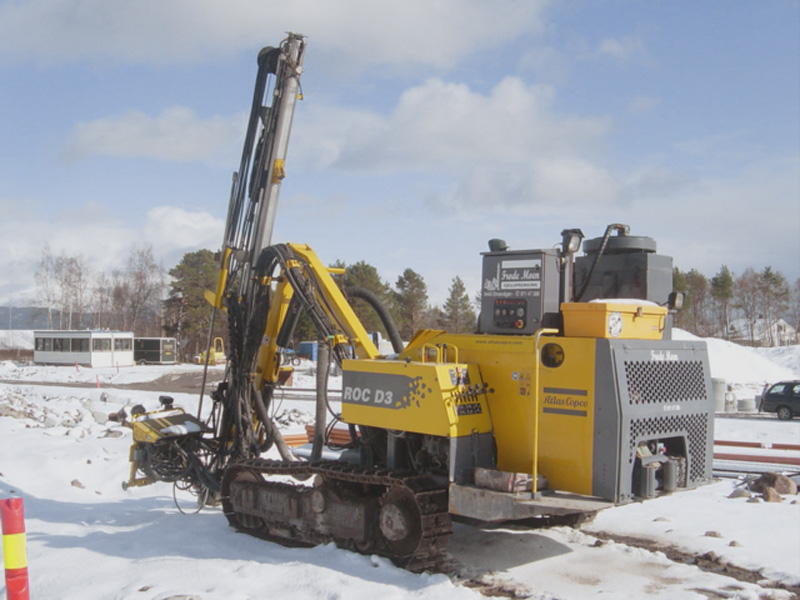
ROC D3

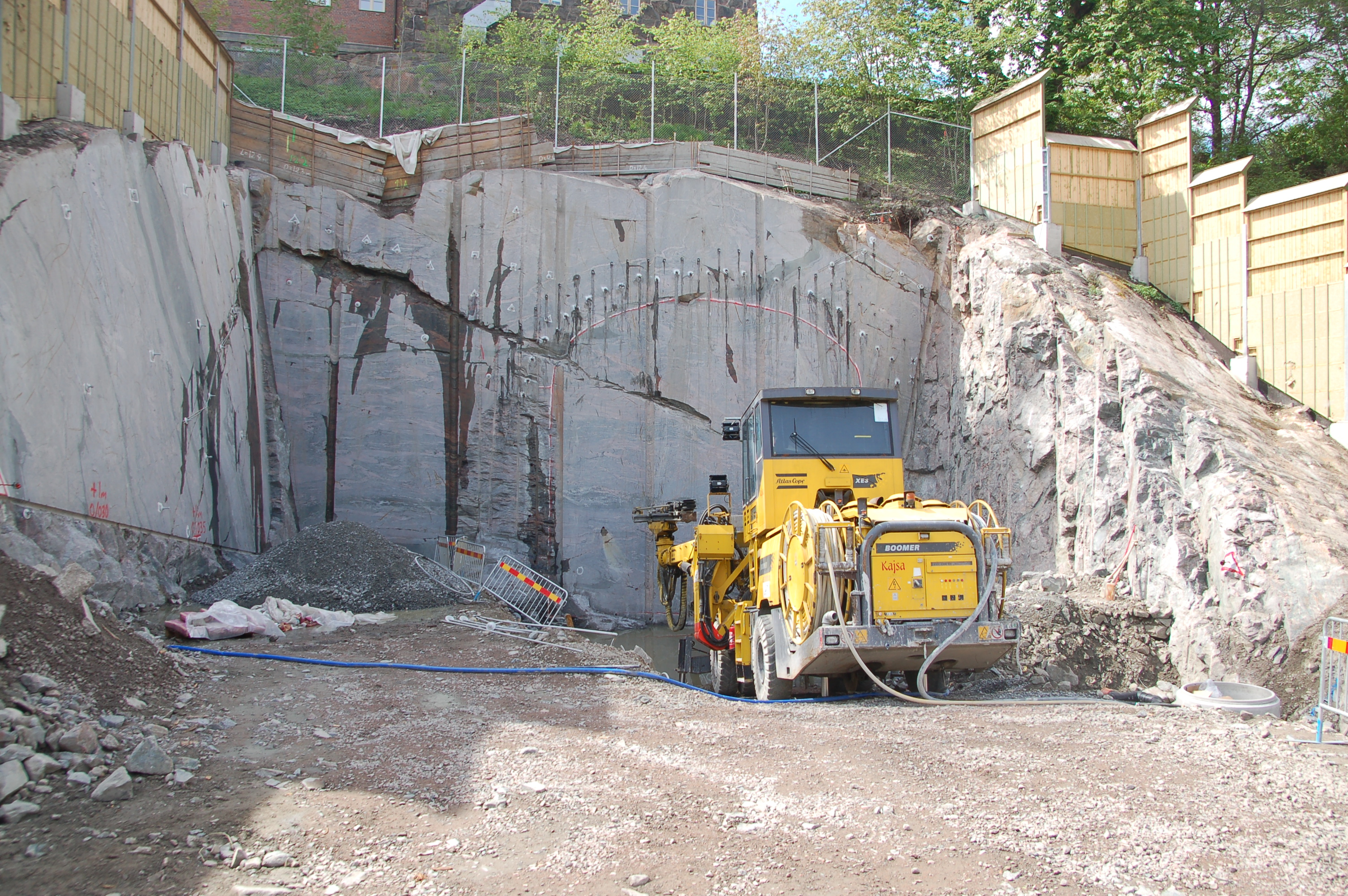
Atlas Copco equipment in the construction of West Link. The construction equipment business belongs to Epiroc.

In 2017, Atlas Copco announced that it planned to move its production of rock excavation, drilling and demolition equipment for the mining and infrastructure sectors into a separate listed company, the shares of which would be distributed to Atlas Copco shareholders. The new company was named Epiroc, and the transaction was completed in 2018. Trading in the shares issued started in June that year.

=== 2020s ===
In 2023, Atlas Copco celebrated its 150th anniversary, marked by a bell-ringing ceremony at Nasdaq in New York City. In November the same year, the identity of the business group was separated from the appearance of products sold under the Atlas Copco brand, by introducing a new and visually distinct logotype that includes the word Group.

== Operations ==
In 2024, the geographic distribution of employees and revenue was as follows.

Geographic area	Share of employees	Share of revenue
Europe	44%	28%
Asia/Ocenania	33%	36%
North America	15%	27%
South America	5%	4%
Africa/Middle East	3%	5%

=== Business areas ===
Since the split-off in 2018 of parts of the business into an independent company, Atlas Copco has been organized around four main business areas: Compressor technique, Vacuum technique, Industrial technique and Power technique.

==== Compressor technique ====
The Compressor technique business area produces, markets and services compressor, expander and treatment equipment for air and gas, as well as air management systems, for industrial and other applications.

The products are used in industries such as air separation, carbon capture, chemicals, electronics, food, health care, hydrogen production, LNG, petrochemicals, pharmaceuticals, power generation, textile, vehicle batteries, and wastewater treatment. The main competitors are Hitachi, Ingersoll Rand, Kaeser, MAN Turbo, Parker Hannifin, and Siemens.

There is development and manufacturing in Belgium, the United States, China, India, Germany, and Italy.

==== Vacuum technique ====
The Vacuum technique business area produces, markets and services systems for vacuum and exhaust management, as well as valves and other related products.

The products are used in manufacturing of display panels, LED light sources, solar panels, other semiconductors, and lithium-ion batteries, as well as in food processing, heat treatment, high-energy lasers, nanotechnology, packaging, pharmaceuticals, scientific measurement, and surface coating. The main competitors are Busch, DAS Environmental Expert, Ebara, Ingersoll Rand, Kashiyama, Pfeiffer Vacuum, and Shimadzu Corporation.

There is development and manufacturing in the United States, Mexico, United Kingdom, Czech Republic, Germany, South Korea, China, and Japan.

==== Industrial technique ====
The Industrial technique business area produces, markets and services industrial power tools, as well as systems for assembly, machine vision and quality assurance.

The products are used in industries such as aerospace, advanced materials, appliances, automobiles and other vehicles, electronics, energy, metal and paper production, solar panels, and general industrial manufacturing. The main competitors are Ametek, Apex Tool Group, BD Tronic, Böllhoff, Bosch, Coherix, Dr. Schenk, Dürr, ESTIC, Graco, Ingersoll Rand, ISV, Nordson, Stanley Black & Decker, Viscotec, and Zeiss.

There is development and manufacturing in Sweden, Germany, Hungary, United Kingdom, France, the United States, China, and Japan.

==== Power technique ====
The Power technique business area produces, markets, leases and services mobile compressors, generators, energy storage units, pumps, and related products, for portable, industrial and dewatering applications.

The products are used by contractors in civil engineering, construction and other sectors, as well as in industrial flow applications. The main competitors are Bran+Luebbe, Doosan, Generac, Kaeser, Milton Roy, and Sullair.

There is development and manufacturing in Belgium, Spain, Germany, the United States, China, and India.

=== Brands ===
Atlas Copco

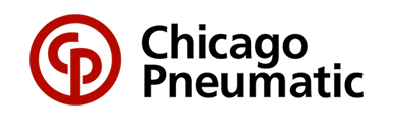
Chicago Pneumatic

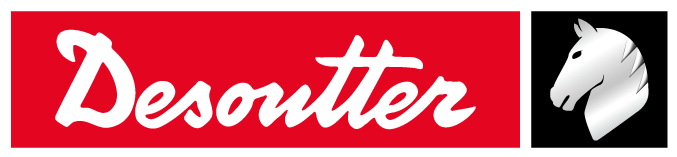
Desoutter Tools

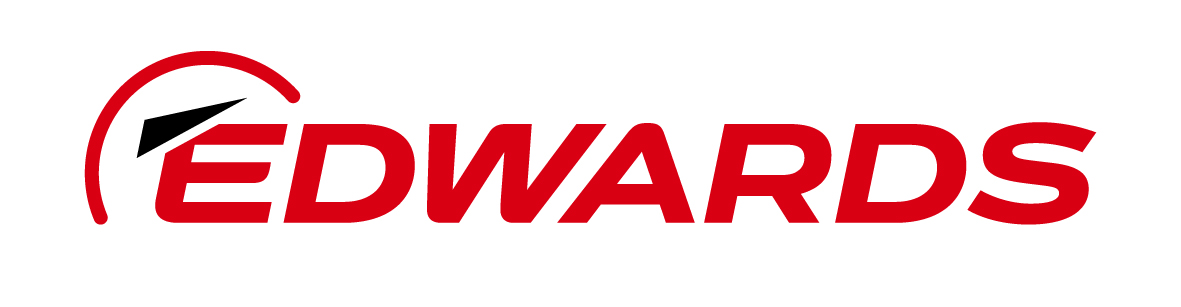
Edwards Vacuum

Leybold

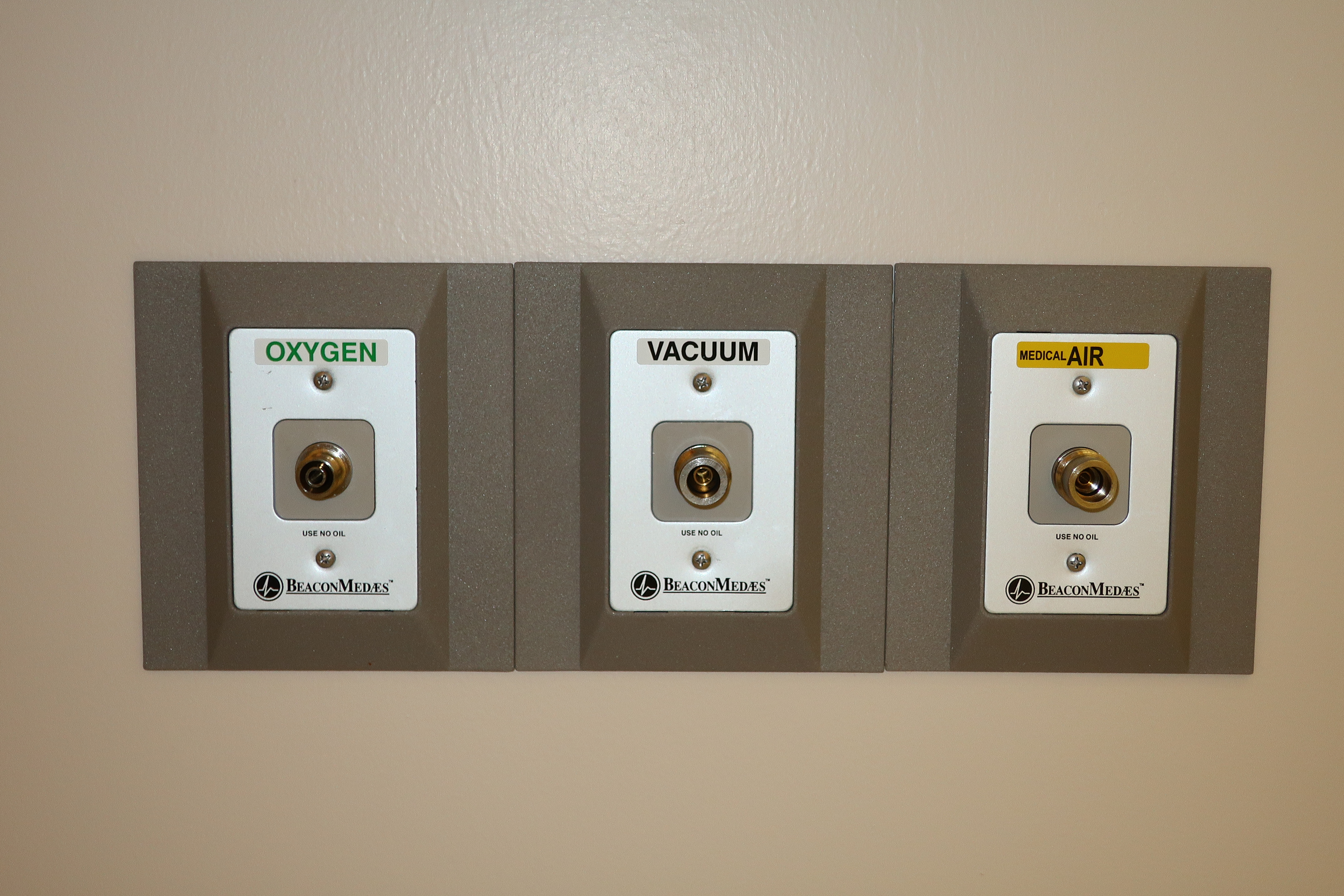
BeaconMedaes oxygen, vacuum, and medical air medical gas supply outlets on a ceiling at Campbell County Memorial Hospital in Gillette, Wyoming

The Atlas Copco Group has around 90 brands, including Atlas Copco and Chicago Pneumatic for compressors and tools, Edwards and Leybold for vacuum systems, BeaconMedaes for medical gas and Desoutter for assembly equipment.

Notable brands include:

- Atlas Copco
- BeaconMedaes
- Chicago Pneumatic
- Desoutter Tools
- Edwards
- Leybold

== Controversies ==
Atlas Copco has faced criticism for its operations in Russia during the geopolitical tensions following the Russian invasion of Ukraine. While the company announced plans to discontinue operations in Russia in line with international sanctions, concerns persist about the timing and ethical implications of its business activities during the conflict.
