= Non-evaporable getter =

Non evaporable getters (NEG), based on the principle of metallic surface sorption of gas molecules, are mostly porous alloys, metallic thin films or powder mixtures of Al, Zr, Ti, V and Fe. They help to establish and maintain vacuums by soaking up or bonding to gas molecules that remain within a partial vacuum. This is done through the use of materials that readily form stable compounds with active gases. They are important tools for improving the performance of many vacuum systems. Sintered onto the inner surface of high vacuum vessels, the NEG coating can be applied even to spaces that are narrow and hard to pump out, which makes it very popular in particle accelerators where this is an issue. The main sorption parameters of the kind of NEGs, like pumping speed and sorption capacity, have low limits.

A different type of NEG, which is not coated, is the Tubegetter. The activation of these getters is accomplished mechanically or at a temperature from 550 K. The temperature range is from 0 to 800 K under HV/UHV conditions.

The NEG acts as a getter or getter pump that is able to reduce the pressure to less than 10^{−12} mbar.

Non-evaporable getters, which work at high temperature, generally consist of a film of a special alloy or a monolithic porous body, often primarily zirconium; the requirement is that the alloy materials must form a passivation layer at room temperature which disappears when heated. Typical heating methods for activation include baking, RF induction, and resistive heating either external or internal to the getter.

Common alloys have names of the form St (Stabil) followed by a number:

- St 707 is 70% zirconium, 24.6% vanadium, and the balance iron.
- St 787 is 80.8% zirconium, 14.2% cobalt, and the balance mischmetal.
- St 101 is 84% zirconium and 16% aluminium.

In tubes used in electronics, the getter material coats plates within the tube which are heated in normal operation; when getters are used within more general vacuum systems, such as in semiconductor manufacturing, they are introduced as separate pieces of equipment in the vacuum chamber, and turned on when needed. Deposited and patterned getter material is being used in microelectronics packaging to provide an ultra-high vacuum in a sealed cavity. To enhance the getter pumping capacity, the activation temperature must be maximized, considering the process limitations.

It is, of course, important not to heat the getter when the system is not already in a good vacuum.

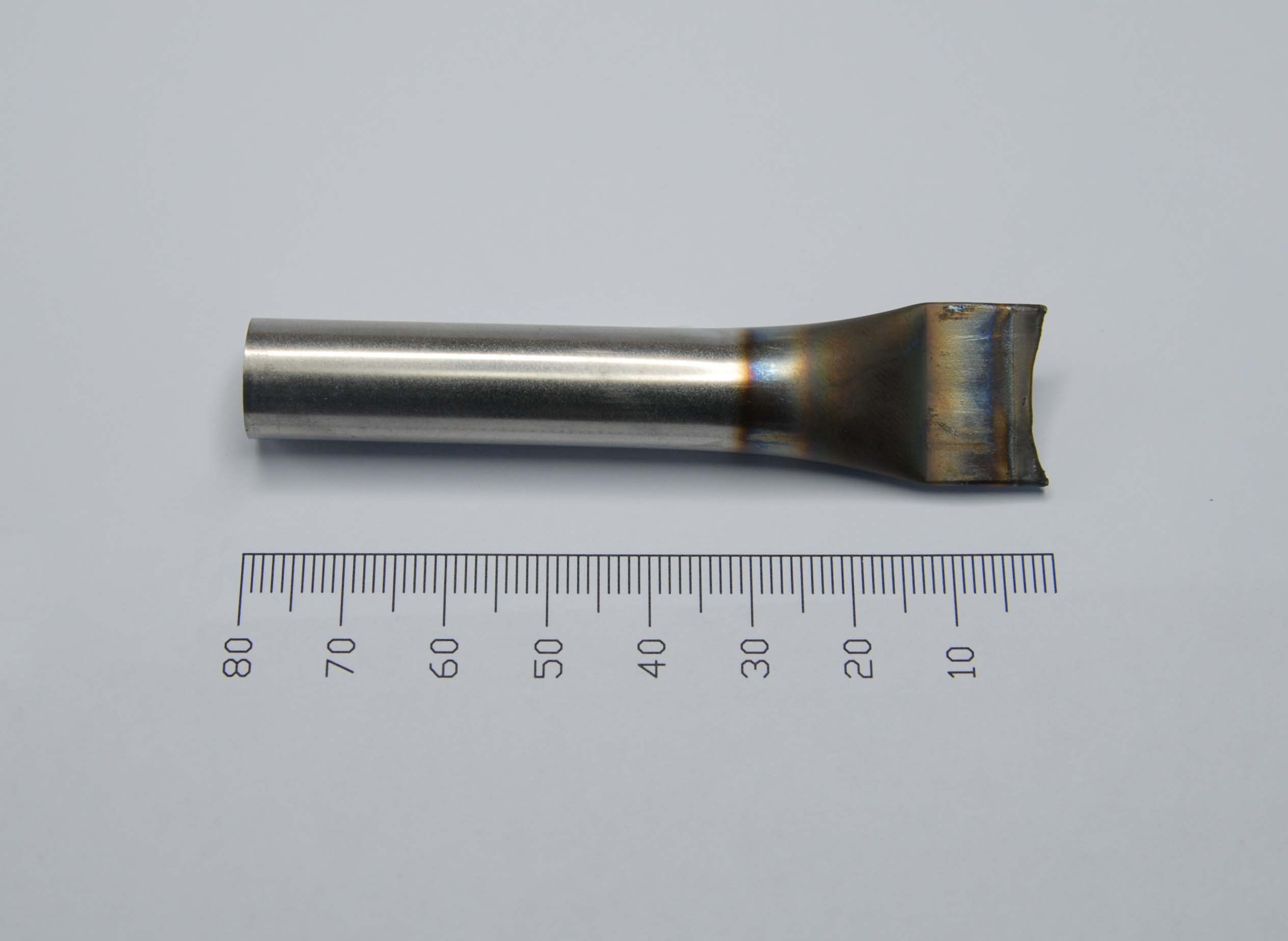
Tubegetter with barium

== See also ==
- Ion pump (physics)
