= Keith McLoughlin =

Keith R. McLoughlin, born June 10 1956, is the non-executive Chairman of the Board of Campbell Soup Company. Previously, he was President and CEO of Electrolux between January 1, 2011 and January 31, 2016.

McLoughlin joined Electrolux in March 2003 as Head of Major Appliances North America, Electrolux business sector for white goods in North America. He also served as Head of Major Appliances in Latin America between 2004 and 2007. In 2011, he became CEO and stepped down in 2016.

Prior to joining Electrolux, McLoughlin was vice president and general manager of DuPont Nonwovens for DuPont Corporation, where he served in a number of senior management positions, leading consumer branded businesses such as Tyvek, Corian and Stainmaster.

McLoughlin also serves on the board of directors of Briggs & Stratton Corp., since 2007.

He is a member of Campbell’s Board of Directors since 2016. In 2018, he became CEO on an interim basis. In 2019, he became chairman.

McLoughlin is a graduate of the United States Military Academy at West Point with a bachelor of science in engineering.
