= Desoutter Tools =

France tool manufacturer

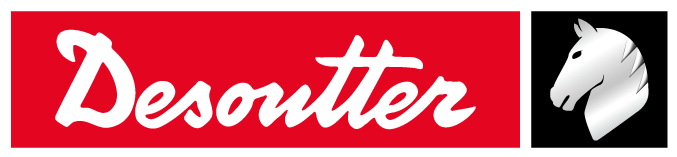
- Native name: Desoutter Industrial Tools
- Company type: Private company
- Industry: Automotive; Aerospace; Off Road; Light Assembly
- Founded: London, England (1914)
- Founder: Marcel Desoutter
- Headquarters: Saint-Herblain, Loire-Atlantique, France
- Area served: Worldwide
- Products: Industrial tools; Assembly Solutions; Maintenance tools; Industry 4.0 Solutions
- Brands: Seti-Tec; Georges Renault; Tech-motive; Scan Rotor; Nexonar; Pivotware
- Number of employees: 1,000 (2015)
- Parent: Atlas Copco
- Subsidiaries: 20 business units
- Website: www.desouttertools.com

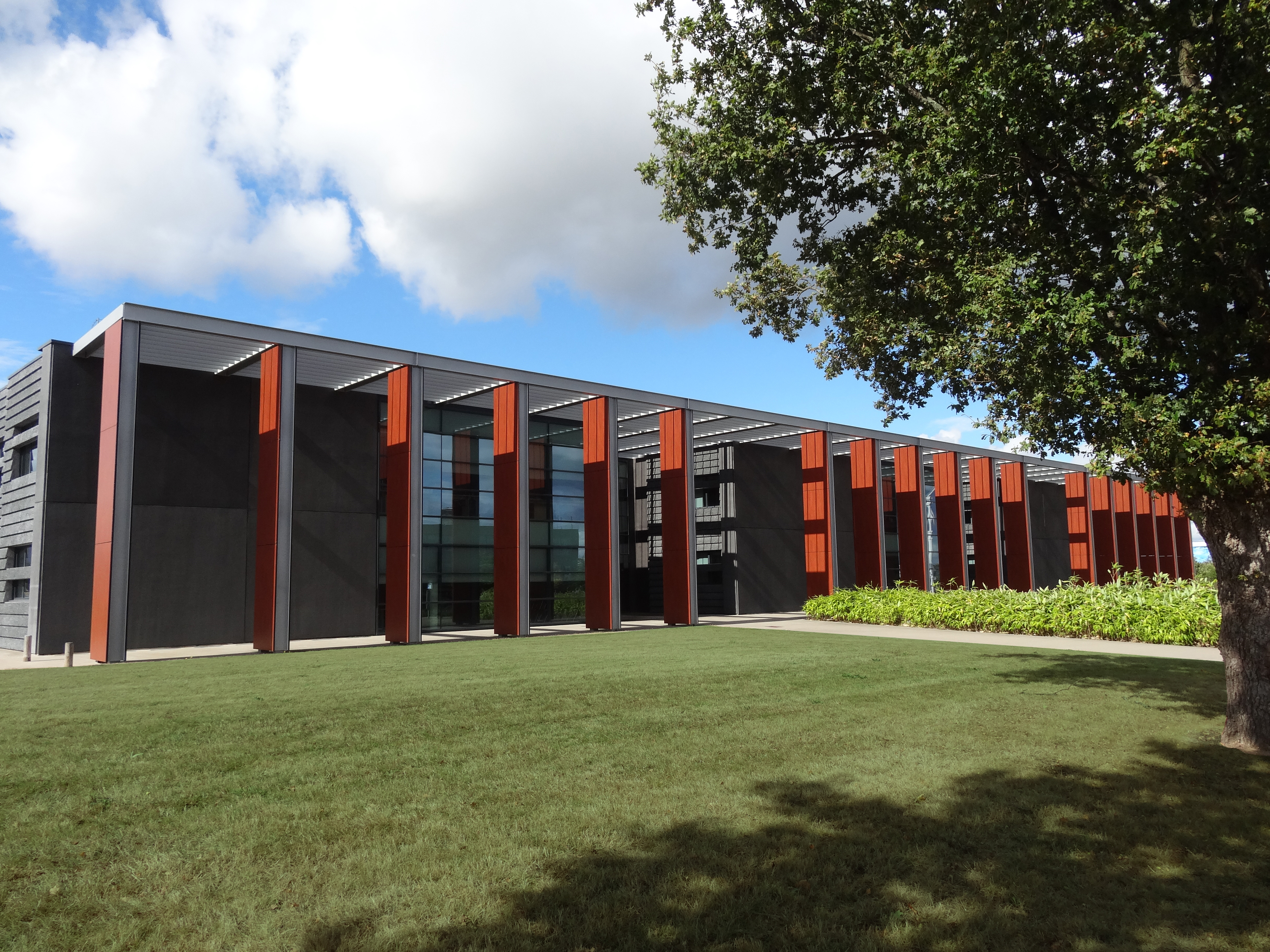
Desoutter Tools main office in Saint-Herblain, 2012

Desoutter Industrial Tools founded in Great Britain in 1914, now headquartered in France, is an industrial manufacturer providing Process Control & Data Analysis Software, as well as electric and formerly pneumatic assembly tools. Products and services are sold in more than 170 countries through 20 business units. Desoutter Tools is active in fields, such as Aerospace, Automotive Industry, Light Assembly and Heavy Vehicles, Off-Road, General Industry.

The French companies Georges Renault in 1989 and Seti-Tec in 2011, the British Pivotware in 2015, German Nexonar in 2022, American Tech-motive in 2005 and the Swedish Scan Rotor in 2004 have been integrated in the Desoutter Tools company.

== History ==
=== Origin ===
Marcel Desoutter, one of the five Desoutter brothers, was an aviator. When he lost a leg in an aircraft crash, he was fitted with an "uncomfortable wooden replacement". His brother Charles helped him regain his mobility by designing a prototype for a new artificial leg made of duralumin. It was the first ever metal leg. Lighter and easier to manoeuvre than wooden legs, Marcel was flying again by the following year.

This innovation was met with interest from other persons needing a lighter artificial leg; and it resulted in the founding of the Desoutter Company, headed by Marcel Desoutter.

=== Product lines ===
From the outset, Desoutter needed to develop specific pneumatic tools to ensure that the aluminium components of the artificial limbs were drilled efficiently.

Adjust to the numerous developments in its production, the company acquired expertise in this field that in the 1950s they decided to make it their sole business.

=== Logo ===
The original idea for this symbol was accredited to Charles Cunliffe who headed Desoutter’s Advertising department for many years after the Second World War. This was a period of growth, particularly owing to the development of a new range of products. Their launch was accompanied by a novel advertising campaign presenting diminutive figures in worker's overalls, but with the heads of horses.

This horsepower concept was developed in many of the brand's advertisements for about twenty years. The managing board at the time even decided that it was the embodiment of the company's identity.

In 1973, the horse's head was combined with the Desoutter logo script, which was a facsimile of Louis Albert Desoutter's signature, one of the company's founders.

To mark the centenary of the brand, the emblem recently adopted a more contemporary graphic design.

=== Products ===
Battery Tools	Electric Tools	Pneumatic Tools	Torque Measurement Systems	Others
E-LIT Series	EB Tools	Fastening Tools	Controllers	Auto Feed Drills and Tappers
B-Flex	Current Control EB Tools	Riveting	Software	Air Motors
	Fastening Tools	Compression Tools		Miscellaneous Tools
		Drills		Accessories
		Tappers		Industry 4.0 Solutions
		Grinders / Sanders		
