= National Flying Services =

Defunct British aviation company

National Flying Services Ltd
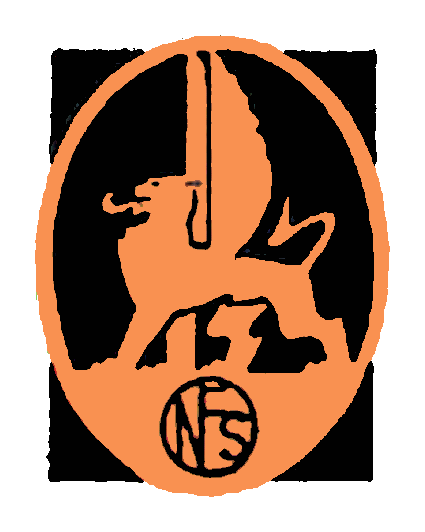
- Company type: Private
- Industry: Aviation: Airports; Training
- Founded: November 1928; 97 years ago in London, UK
- Founder: Freddie Guest
- Defunct: 1935
- Fate: Bought out
- Headquarters: London, England
- Key people: Freddie Guest; Master of Sempill

National Flying Services Ltd was a company aiming to create and manage a large number of airfields and flying clubs around Britain. It relied on government subsidy, and it collapsed when the subsidy was withdrawn in 1934, because the aims had not been achieved.

== History ==
=== Formation ===
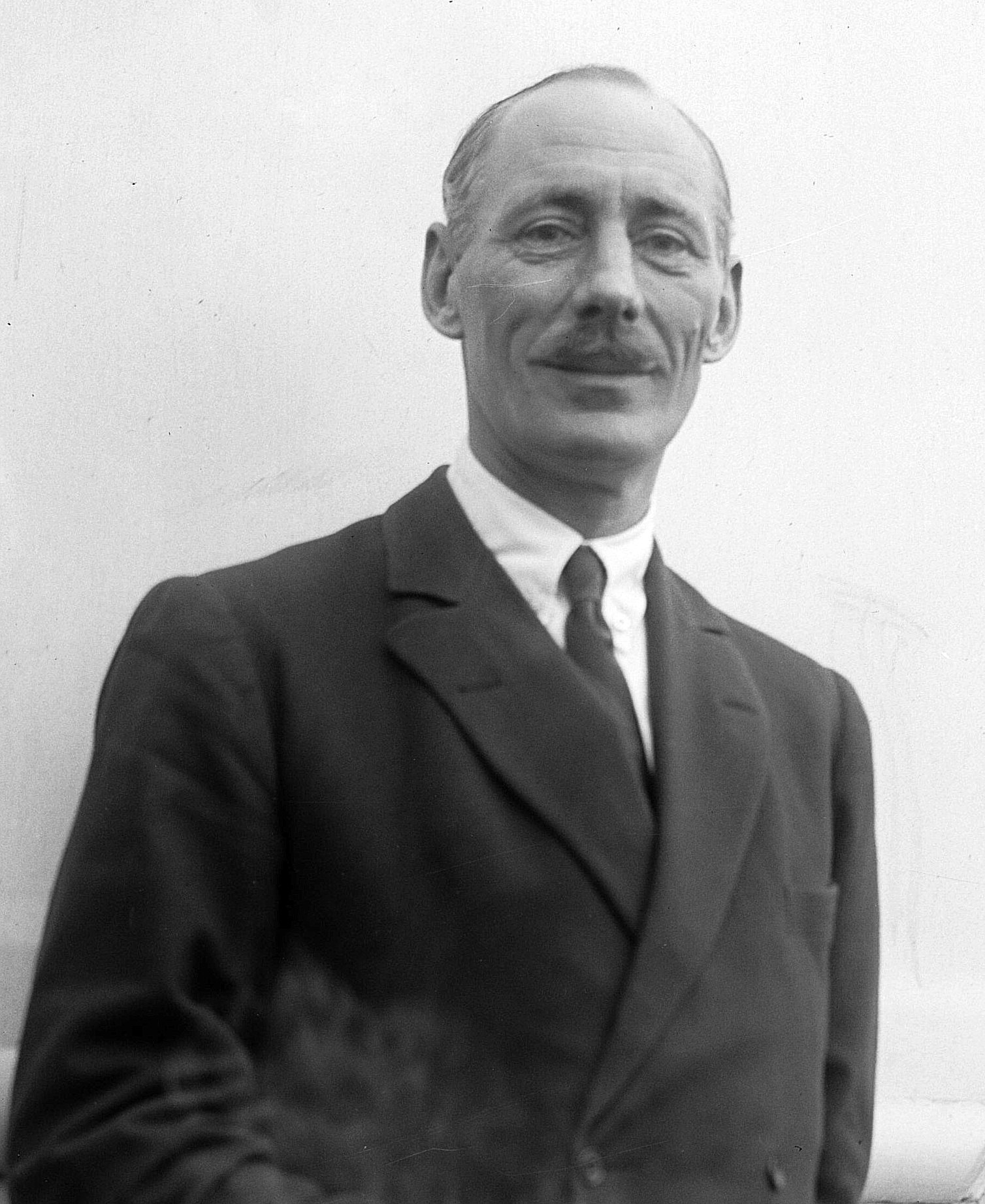
Capt. Frederick Edward Guest

National Flying Services (NFS) was founded in November 1928 by Freddie Guest, a cousin of Winston Churchill, who had been the Liberal Member of Parliament (MP) for Bristol North, losing his seat in the general election held in May that year, and had been Secretary of State for Air in 1921-2.

The objective of the company was to create a network of landing grounds and flying clubs around the UK. In 1929, the government published a white paper that effectively established a subsidy for the company’s operations, especially in training new pilots and maintaining their proficiency. This caused some controversy, as local councils were already establishing their own airfields, with flying clubs that would be undercut by NFS. The company would be granted finance for “20 new aerodromes and 80 new landing grounds”.

In Parliament Captain Guest said that he would be taking no fee from his new venture, and that the plan was for around 25 flying schools and at least 100 landing grounds. By providing standardised training with a large fleet of British-built aircraft, the whole industry would be supported.

The scheme went ahead. A head office was established at Grand Buildings, Trafalgar Square, London WC2, but the centre of operations was at Hanworth Park where a country house and its grounds were renamed London Air Park. An inaugural luncheon was held at the Savoy Hotel on 17 April 1929, and an advert in August 1929 claimed that NFS would “form a chain of 71 flying clubs and landing stations, with London Air Park at Hanworth as the centre".

=== Operations ===
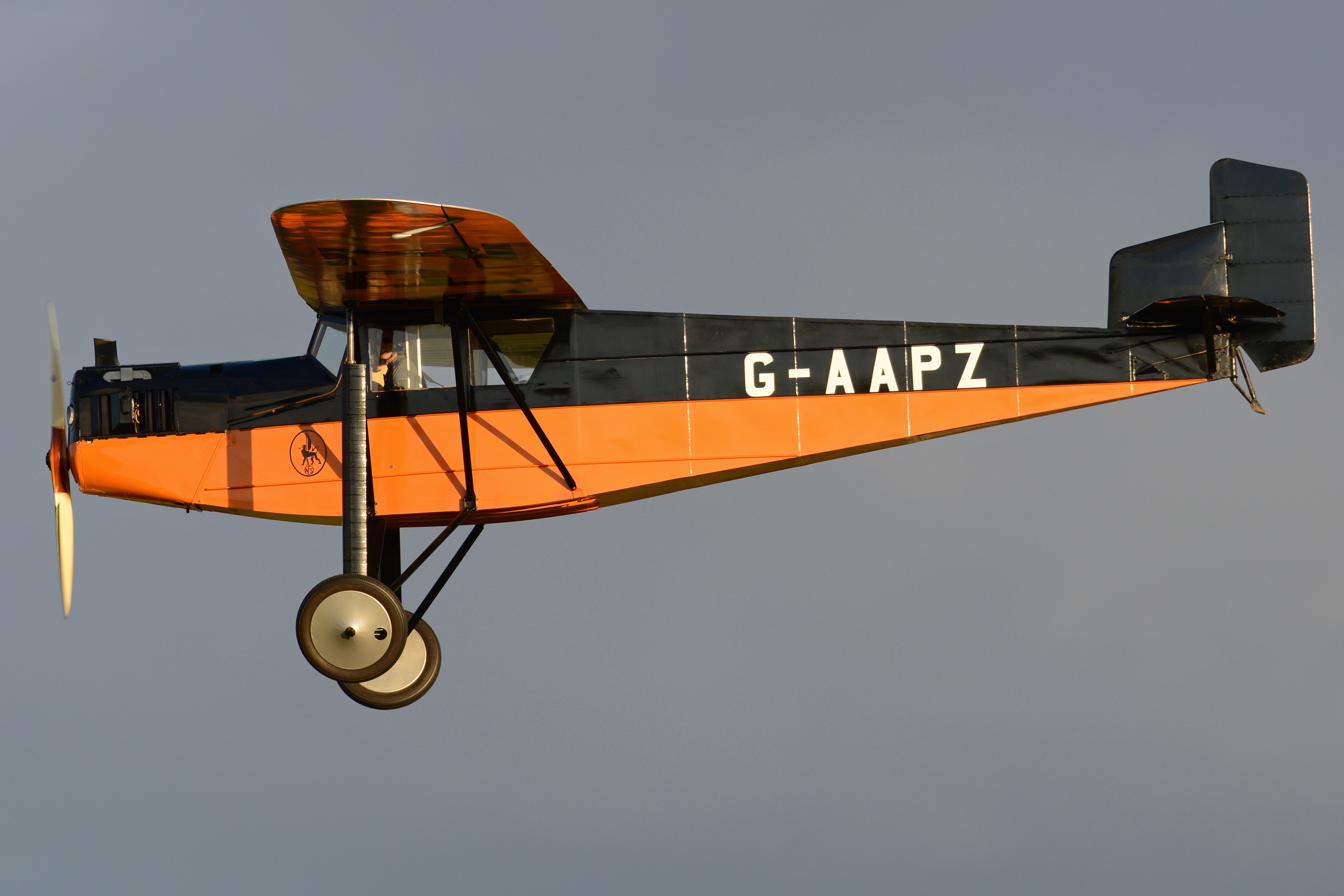
Desoutter I G-AAPZ of the Shuttleworth Collection in its original NFS colours

The London Air Park opened on 31 August 1929, with the house now a country club, and it operated with a great deal of success, becoming a social and aeronautical hub. Within weeks, the Berks, Bucks and Oxon Light Aeroplane Club at Woodley Aerodrome, Hull Aero Club at Hedon Aerodrome, and The Yorkshire Aeroplane Club at Sheburn-in-Elmet had signed up.

The following year only Nottingham (Tollerton Aerodrome) was added to the chain. With this slow progress, two noted aviators joined the board, Sir Alan Cobham (Note: Cobham had recently conducted his Municipal Aerodrome Campaign around Britain, encouraging local councils to establish airfields.) and Colonel the Master of Sempill who became chairman. Freddie Guest left to return to politics as Conservative MP for Plymouth Drake.

In 1931, Blackpool Municipal Aerodrome (Stanley Park) joined the NFS scheme, and in 1932 so did Leeds-Bradford (Yeadon Aerodrome) and Stoke-on-Trent (Meir Aerodrome). In addition to the successful Hanworth Air Park, just six airfields had joined the scheme.

==== Airfields in the NFS scheme 1932-33 ====
From a 1932 NFS advert

Area	Airfield	Club
London	London Air Park, Hanworth	The Hanworth Club
Blackpool	Stanley Park	Blackpool and Fylde Aero Club
Hull	Hedon	Hull Aero Club
Leeds-Bradford	Yeadon (moved from Sheburn)	Yorkshire Aeroplane Club
Nottingham	Tollerton	Nottingham Flying Club
Reading	Woodley	Berks, Bucks and Oxon Aero Club
Stoke-on-Trent	Meir	Staffordshire Aero Club

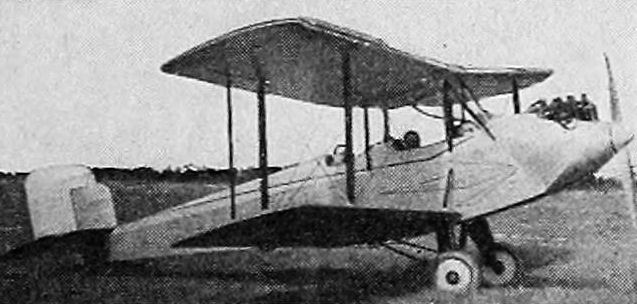
A Simmonds Spartan

Along with their club and training operations. NFS also did some maintenance and repair work, ran air taxi services, and became dealers for second-hand light aircraft. They were sole UK distributors for Desoutter aircraft.

=== Demise ===
By 1933, with hardly any growth in the previous two years, the financial situation was dire. Apart from the London Air Park at Hanworth, NFS had not created any new airfields or landing grounds. The company was nowhere near fulfilling its agreement with the government, which as from August 1932 withdrew its subsidy and grant, which had been £5,000 the previous year, (equivalent to £294,500 in 2025).

The company went into receivership in June 1933, but continued operating until 1934. Most of the airfields were taken back into council control and many clubs took ownership of the NFS aircraft that had been allocated to them. The remaining aircraft were disposed of by October 1934. The Desoutter Aircraft Company collapsed with the loss of its major customer; at least 20 aircraft had been ordered but were not going to be delivered. Blackburn also had to write off orders for 15 Bluebird IVs from a planned order of 25 which would have been built by Saunders-Roe. Hanworth Aerodrome was put up for sale in July 1934.

Remaining assets were taken over by a company called The British Pacific Trust (BPT), who had previously acquired General Aircraft Limited (GAL). They integrated the two concerns at Hanworth in 1935 to build GAL’s Monospar aircraft series at NFS’s Hanworth facilities. National Flying Services Ltd was officially struck off in 1937.

== Fleet ==
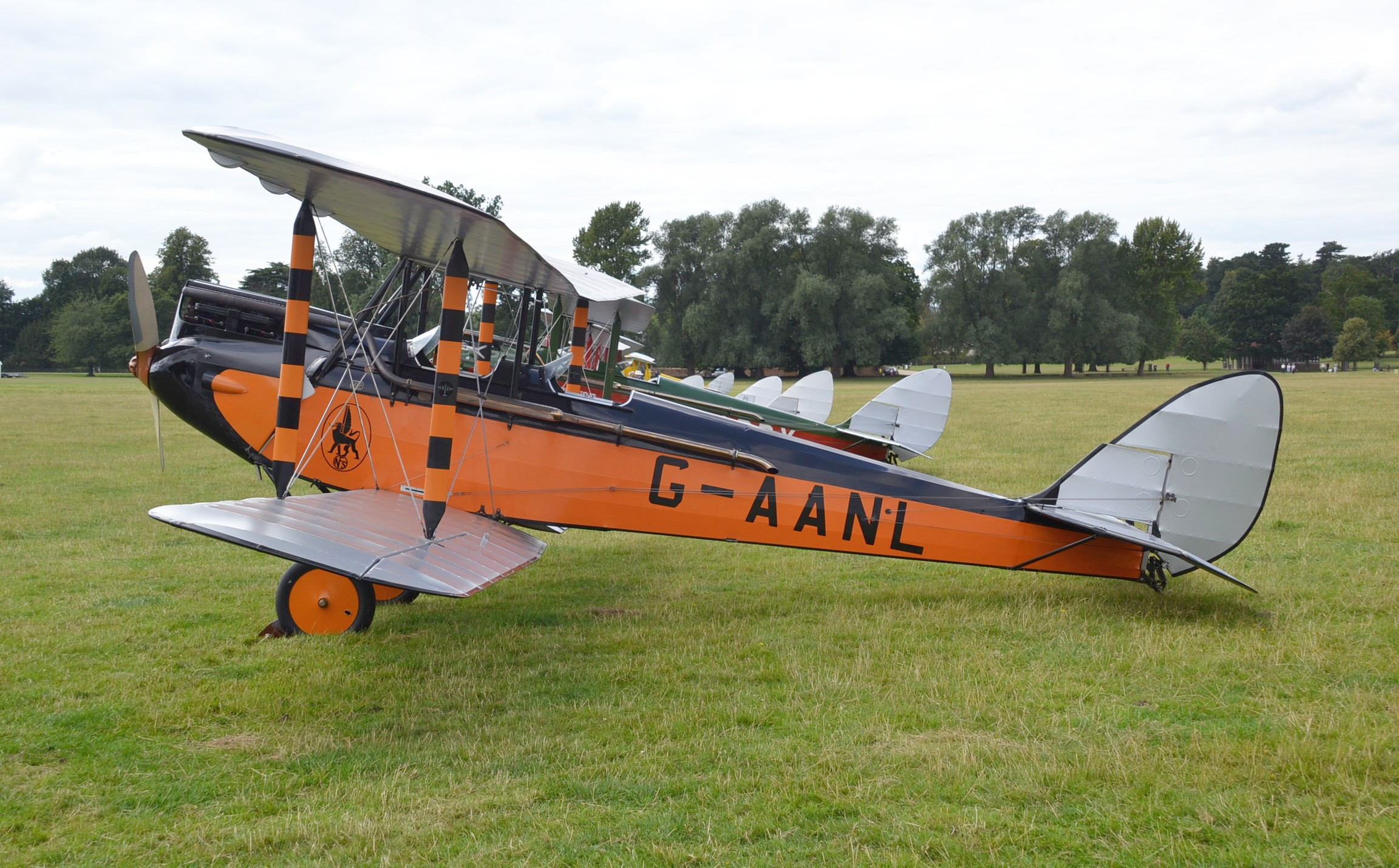
de Havilland DH.60G Moth G-AANL in NFS markings. (Note: G-AANL, a registration reserved by NFS, was not taken up, and the aircraft was sold in Denmark as OY-DEH in 1929. It was re-registered in Britain in 1987.)

in 1929 NFS reserved a huge block of civil registrations, from G-AAMA to G-AAPZ, amounting to 98 aircraft. (Note: The letter Q was not allocated, and two aircraft in the range, 'NL and 'NV, were not taken up, and sold abroad.) 39 of these were not delivered, and some others were dealer aircraft for prompt onward sale.

The mainstays of the NFS fleet were the de Havilland DH.60 Moth, with around 30 operated, the Desoutter 1 with around 19, the Simmonds Spartan (12), and the Blackburn Bluebird IV with 10. Aircraft operated in smaller numbers were the Avro Avian (3), and single examples of the De Havilland DH.61 Giant Moth, de Havilland DH.80A Puss Moth, and Southern Martlet.

The standard livery was overall black, with silver wings and the lower half of the fuselage orange.

== Accidents and incidents ==
The following are fatal accidents involving aircraft registered to National Flying Services, so do not include those registered to individual flying clubs.

Date	Aircraft	Notes
28 July 1929	Simmonds Spartan G-AAMC	Crashed during aerobatics at Hanworth Park. Sole occupant killed
6 April 1930	Blackburn Bluebird IV G-AAOA	Spun in and caught fire on take-off from Hanworth Park. Sole occupant killed
6 May 1930	de Havilland DH.60X Moth G-AAPN	Dived into ground at Hampton, Middlesex during test flight from Hanwoth Park. Sole occupant killed
22 October 1930	de Havilland DH.60 Moth G-EBPR	Spun in on take-off from RAF Halton, Buckinghamshire. Both occupants killed
12 September 1931	Desoutter Mk I G-AANC	Hit trees in dense mist en-route from Cowes to Hanworth Park. All three occupants killed
20 February 1932	de Havilland DH.60X Moth G-AAPO	Spun in during climb from Hanworth Park. Sole occupant died of injuries 10 months later
18 May 1932	de Havilland DH.60X Moth G-AAPL	Crashed south of Grimsby due to wing failure en-route Hedon Aerodrome to Hanworth Park. Both occupants killed

== See also ==
Straight Corporation, a similar but more successful venture started in 1935.

== Bibliography ==
- Jackson, A. J. (1988). Blackburn Aircraft since 1909 (2nd ed.). London: Putnam. ISBN 0-85177-830-5.
- Myerscough, John (1985). "Airport Provision in the Inter-War Years". Journal of Contemporary History. 20 (1): 41–70. doi:10.1177/002200948502000103. JSTOR 260490. S2CID 162295833.
