= United States International Programming to Ukraine and Neighboring Regions =

- Long title: A bill entitled "United States International Programming to Ukraine and Neighboring Regions".
- Announced in: the 113th United States Congress
- Sponsored by: Senator Mitch McConnell (R-KY)

Citations
- Public law: Pub. L. 113–96 (text) (PDF)

Legislative history
- Introduced in the Senate as S. 2183 by Senator Mitch McConnell (R-KY) on March 27, 2014; Passed the Senate on March 27, 2014 (unanimous consent); Passed the House on April 1, 2014 (Roll Call Vote 150: 399-12); Signed into law by President Barack Obama on April 3, 2014

The United States International Programming to Ukraine and Neighboring Regions (S. 2183; Pub. L. 113–96 (text) (PDF)) is a law that authorizes the federal government to spend $10 million on programming for Radio Free Europe/Radio Liberty and the Voice of America to be broadcast into Ukraine. The goal of the increased funding would be to combat the Russian "propaganda" into the Crimean peninsula, which had been illegally annexed by Russia in 2014, provoking international condemnation and severe economic sanctions against Russia.

The United States House of Representatives wrote in their bill to provide aid to Ukraine, the Ukraine Support Act (H.R. 4278; 113th Congress), that "the Russian Government has deliberately blocked the Ukrainian people's access to uncensored sources of information and has provided alternative news and information that is both inaccurate and inflammatory." The Senate's Ukraine aid bill failed to include any provisions to provide increased funding to Radio Free Europe/Radio Liberty or the Voice of America, so they wrote this separate bill to do so.

The law was passed during the 113th United States Congress.

== Background ==
=== Russo-Ukrainian War ===
The 2014 Crimean crisis is an ongoing international crisis principally involving Russia and Ukraine. Most developments apply to the Crimean Peninsula, formerly a multi-ethnic region of Ukraine composed of the Autonomous Republic of Crimea and the administratively separate municipality of Sevastopol; both are populated by an ethnic Russian majority and a minority of both ethnic Ukrainians and Crimean Tatars.

The crisis unfolded in late February 2014 in the aftermath of the Ukrainian Revolution which resulted in President Viktor Yanukovich's impeachment by the Ukrainian parliament after his flight from the capital, and the interim appointment of a new government. The Yatsenyuk Government attained recognition from western countries. However, the Russian government held that Yanukovych was illegally impeached and continues to regard him as Ukraine's last democratically elected and legitimate president, (Note: Lally; Englund (2014) "The current government is illegitimate, Russia contends, because Yanukovych was not properly removed from power in a formal impeachment.") while considering the Yatsenyuk government illegitimate and the result of a "coup d'etat", (Note: Gumuchian; Morgan; Chance (2014) "Moscow has denounced the events that led to Yanukovych's ouster as an illegitimate coup and has refused to recognize the new Ukrainian authorities, putting the two countries on a collision course over control of Crimea, which has longstanding ties to Russia and has thousands of Russian troops stationed there.") (Note: Dawber (2014) "Vladimir Putin has given a confident performance in front of the media, insisting that the events of the last 10 days in Ukraine amounted to nothing less than a coup d’état.") (Note: The Washington Post (2014) "[Putin says:] Are the current authorities legitimate? The Parliament is partially, but all the others are not. The current Acting President is definitely not legitimate. There is only one legitimate President, from a legal standpoint. Clearly, he has no power. However, as I have already said, and will repeat: Yanukovych is the only undoubtedly legitimate President.") on constitutional grounds.

Beginning on February 26, pro-Russian forces began to gradually take control of the Crimean peninsula. At first the gunmen, wearing masks and unmarked uniforms, seized government buildings but by no later than 24 March had occupied all Ukrainian military bases in Crimea, forcing Ukrainian armed forces to withdraw from the peninsula. During this time, the question of secession was put to a referendum, which resulted in a 96% affirmative vote but has been condemned by the EU, US, and the interim Ukraine government as unconstitutional and thus illegal. Despite international opposition, on March 17 the Crimean parliament declared independence from Ukraine and asked to join the Russian Federation. As a result, on March 27 the U.N. General Assembly passed a non-binding Resolution 68/262 that declared invalid Crimea's referendum.

=== United States Congressional response ===
On March 5, 2014, U.S. Representative Hal Rogers introduced the bill To provide for the costs of loan guarantees for Ukraine (H.R. 4152; 113th Congress), a bill that would provide loan guarantees to Ukraine of up to $1 billion, part of the American response to the 2014 Russian military intervention in Ukraine. On March 6, 2014, the House voted in Roll Call Vote 114 to pass the bill 385–23. On March 25, 2014, Senate Majority Leader Harry Reid indicated that United States Senate would vote on this bill on March 27, 2014, but only after amending it to include provisions that would put sanctions "against anyone deemed by the president to have undermined Ukraine's security or independence, or to have engaged in corruption in Ukraine or Russia."

On March 12, 2014, U.S. Senator Robert Menendez introduced the Support for the Sovereignty, Integrity, Democracy, and Economic Stability of Ukraine Act of 2014 (S. 2124; 113th Congress), a bill that would provide funds to implement a U.S. quota increase at the International Monetary Fund (IMF), rescind other funds previously appropriated for the IMF, and provide or authorize various forms of assistance to Ukraine and the surrounding region. It would require sanctions on individuals responsible for violence, corruption, human rights abuses, or undermining stability in Ukraine, and would authorize sanctions on certain individuals in Russia. On March 24, 2014, the Senate voted 78–17 to advance the bill to floor consideration. Consideration of the bill was withdrawn, however, the next day, after a decision by Majority Leader Harry Reid. Instead of continuing with this bill and its controversial International Monetary Fund provisions, the Senate was to take up a House-passed bill already offering Ukraine loan guarantees, amending it to add sanctions provisions.

=== Radio Free Europe/Radio Liberty ===
Radio Free Europe/Radio Liberty (RFE/RL) is a broadcaster funded by the U.S. Congress that provides "news, information, and analysis" to countries in Eastern Europe, Central Asia, and the Middle East "where the free flow of information is either banned by government authorities or not fully developed". RFE/RL is supervised by the Broadcasting Board of Governors, a bi-partisan federal agency overseeing all U.S. international broadcasting services.

RFE/RL was headquartered at Englischer Garten in Munich, Germany, from 1949 to 1995. In 1995, the headquarters were moved to Prague in the Czech Republic. European operations have been significantly reduced since the end of the Cold War. In addition to the headquarters, the service maintains 20 local bureaus in countries throughout their broadcast region, as well as a corporate office in Washington, D.C. RFE/RL broadcasts in 28 languages to 21 countries including Armenia, Russia, Iran, Afghanistan, Pakistan, and Iraq.

== Provisions of the bill ==
This summary is based largely on the summary provided by the Congressional Research Service, a public domain source.

The bill would direct Radio Free Europe/Radio Liberty (RFE/RL), Incorporated, and the Voice of America (VOA) service to Ukraine and neighboring regions to: (1) provide accurate and accessible news and information; (2) emphasize investigative and analytical journalism to highlight misinformation provided by Russian or pro-Russian media outlets; (3) prioritize programming to target populations and areas where access to uncensored information is limited, especially populations serviced by Russian supported media outlets; (4) increase the number of reporters and organizational presence in eastern Ukraine, especially in Crimea; (5) promote democratic processes, human rights, freedom of the press, and territorial sovereignty; (6) increase programming and content services to Russia; (7) partner with private sector broadcasters and affiliates to increase distribution; (8) expand the use and audience of mobile news and multimedia platforms, including through Internet-based social networking platforms; and (9) provide programming content 24 hours a day, 7 days a week to target populations, including specified programming in Ukrainian, Russian, and Tatar languages.

The bill would authorize FY2014 appropriations for programming in the Ukrainian, Balkan, Russian, and Tatar language services of RFE/RL, Incorporated, and VOA.

The bill would require the Broadcasting Board of Governors to report to Congress on plans to increase broadcasts.

== Procedural history ==
The United States International Programming to Ukraine and Neighboring Regions was introduced on March 27, 2014, by Senator Mitch McConnell (R-KY). The bill was not referred to any committees. The United States Senate voted on March 27, 2014, by unanimous consent to pass the bill. The House voted on April 1, 2014, to pass the bill 399–12 in Roll Call Vote 150. President Barack Obama signed the bill into law on April 3, 2014.

== Debate and discussion ==
Representative Ed Royce argued in favor of funding increased broadcasts by Radio Free Europe/Radio Liberty and the Voice of America because "Moscow is using propaganda to sow confusion and fear in the Ukraine right now."

== See also ==
- List of bills in the 113th United States Congress
- List of acts of the 113th United States Congress
