= International reactions to the Russian annexation of Crimea =

International reaction to the annexation of Crimea by the Russian Federation according to official governmental statements. (Note: If an official position can be sorted in more than one category, the "strongest" position was marked (from the "call for a peaceful resolution" to "interpretation as a military intervention" consecutively). For the sources see the image description.) Statements only voicing concern or hope for peaceful resolution to the conflict Support for Ukrainian territorial integrity Condemnation of Russian actions Condemnation of Russian actions as a military intervention or invasion Support for Russian actions and/or condemnation of the Ukrainian interim government "Recognition of Russian and other interests" No notable statements Ukraine Russia

International reactions to the 2014 Russian annexation of Crimea have largely been condemnatory of Russia's actions, supportive of Ukraine's sovereignty and territorial integrity, and supportive of finding a quick end to the crisis. The United States and the European Union responded by enacting sanctions against Russia for its role in the crisis, and urged Russia to withdraw. Russia accused the United States and the EU of funding and directing the revolution and retaliated to the sanctions by imposing its own.

== UN member and observer states ==
- Afghanistan – President Hamid Karzai said, "we respect the decision the people of Crimea took through a recent referendum that considers Crimea as part of the Russian Federation". An Afghan presidential spokesman later said that Karzai's statement is the official recognition of the new border by Afghanistan, and called the annexation a "legitimate move".
- Albania – On 3 March, in a statement, the Ministry of Foreign Affairs condemned the military intervention of the Russian Federation in Ukraine, in defiance of the norms of international law and in violation of territorial sovereignty and integrity of the country.
- Argentina – On 15 March, the Argentine representative to the UN Security Council, María Cristina Perceval, voted in favor of a US-sponsored resolution condemning the 16 March referendum. She elaborated that she had voted in favour of the resolution because it "asserted the principle of territorial integrity and would have contributed to constructive dialogue towards a peaceful solution involving all political actors. While urging refraining from actions that would hamper such a solution, she said it was indeed for Ukrainians to decide their own affairs. It was not for the Council to define the situation, but rather, to maintain international peace and security. Argentina hoped all countries would respect the principle of non-interference in State affairs."
  On 19 March, during a press conference in Paris, Argentine President Cristina Fernández de Kirchner accused the Western Powers of 'double standards' for condemning the referendum in Crimea but supporting the referendum in the Falkland Islands (an overseas territory of the UK which is claimed by Argentina but whose people voted for British sovereignty in 2013). President Putin later called Fernández to thank her for her support. Argentina went on to abstain in the vote on United Nations General Assembly Resolution 68/262.
- Armenia – On 7 March, President Serzh Sargsyan stated at the European People's Party session in Dublin that the "Ukrainian events are a matter of serious concern to all of us". He called "to take all possible measures in order to ease the tension and find reasonable solutions by the means of a dialogue." During a phone conversation with Putin on 19 March, President Sargsyan said the referendum in Crimea was an exercise of peoples' right to self-determination via free expression of will.
- Australia – On 2 March, Prime Minister Tony Abbott said that Russia's actions in Ukraine were "not the kind ... of a friend and neighbour and I think Russia should back off". The Prime Minister told the Australian House of Representatives on 3 March that "Russia should back off, it should withdraw its forces from the Ukraine and people of the Ukraine ought to be able to determine their future themselves" with the Australian Government cancelling a planned visit to Russia by the Trade Minister Andrew Robb.
- Azerbaijan – Azerbaijani ambassador to Ukraine, Eynulla Madatli, expressed public support on 3 March for Ukraine's territorial integrity.
- Belarus – On 28 February 2014, the Foreign Ministry expressed its concerns about the events in Ukraine. On 19 March, the Foreign Ministry published another statement saying in part that "Belarus is against one-sided, biased interpretation of the principles of international law to satisfy geopolitical interests...". On 23 March, President Alexander Lukashenko described Crimea as a de facto part of Russia, but noted that "Ukraine should remain an integral, indivisible, non-aligned state". A 2016 analysis of Belarus's official statements by the Carnegie Moscow Center found that Lukashenko had contradicted himself multiple times and that the position of Belarus was ambiguous. In November 2021, Lukashenko recognized Crimea as being Russian and announced that he would visit the peninsula.
- Bosnia and Herzegovina – On 2 March, Foreign Minister Zlatko Lagumdžija called for "Immediate calming of tensions as a key prerequisite for the maintenance of peace, security, sovereignty and territorial integrity of Ukraine as a full member of the UN" and said that "Sovereign Ukraine and its people have the right to define their own future, peacefully and through democratic dialogue, which guarantees stability and the international community has a duty and an obligation to support this".
- Bulgaria – On 1 March, President Rosen Plevneliev said in a statement that "Bulgaria is for preserving the sovereignty, the territorial integrity and the democratic future of Ukraine". The President further said that the presence of foreign forces and their unauthorized activity within the territory of a sovereign state "raises serious concern" and called for an end to any provocative actions that could lead to "irreparable consequences not only for the region, but also for the international order". In a later statement that day, following the Russia's Parliament decree allowing the usage of Russian armed forces in Crimea, President Plevneliev reiterated that "the only lasting solution may be achieved by peaceful means and if the territorial integrity and sovereignty of Ukraine is guaranteed" and that "[t]he usage of military force to occupy foreign territories is violation of the rules of international law". The President also called on the UN Security Council and the countries-guarantors to the Budapest Memorandum to ensure a peaceful solution to the problem and to avoid a further escalation of the tension. In conclusion, President Plevneliev stated that "[t]he people of Ukraine should alone decide what their future should be in a democratic way".
- Canada – On Feb. 28 Foreign Minister John Baird "congratulated the new government and emphasized the need to honour the 1994 Budapest Declaration's commitment to Ukraine's territorial sovereignty and national unity at this critical time." On a 1 March phone call President Obama and Prime Minister Stephen Harper "affirmed the importance of unity within the international community in support of international law, and the future of Ukraine and its democracy.' On the same day, Harper condemned Russia's military intervention in Ukraine; he announced that Canada had both recalled its ambassador to Russia and withdrew from preparations for the 40th G8 summit, which was to be chaired by Russia. On 3 March, the Canadian House of Commons passed unanimous motion condemning Russia's intervention in Crimea. This was followed by Prime Minister Harper calling Russia's actions an "invasion and occupation" and Foreign Minister Baird comparing them to Nazi Germany's occupation of the Sudetenland in 1938. Canada then suspended all military cooperation with Russia and the flag of Ukraine was flown on Parliament Hill in Ottawa on 4 March. On 7 March, Canada requested any Russian military servicemen (at least nine) to leave its territory in 24 hours.
- Chad – 15 March the Chadian representative to the UN Security Council, Mamet Zene Cherif voted in favor of a US sponsored resolution condemning the 16 March referendum. He elaborated that his Government had consistently supported Ukraine's sovereignty and territorial integrity, and had voted in favour of the resolution out of a commitment to such principles. Concerned about the continued escalation of the crisis, despite the Council's appeals for restraint and calm, he said it was still possible for the parties to open the way for national reconciliation and maintenance of territorial integrity by engaging in dialogue. With that, he reiterated the importance of upholding the principles of territorial integrity, non-use of force and peaceful settlement of disputes, in line with the Charter.
- Chile – 15 March the Chilean representative to the UN Security Council, Octavio Errazuriz voted in favor of a US sponsored resolution condemning the 16 March referendum. He elaborated that "as it was an appropriate response to the crisis in Ukraine. The Budapest Memorandum required the parties to observe Ukraine's independence and current borders, and to refrain from military measures. The planned referendum was not in line with Ukraine's Constitution, he said, emphasizing the fundamental importance of ensuring that the rule of law was observed, nationally and internationally. Indeed, it was for Ukrainians to choose their future through a democratic process that respected minority rights. The crisis must be resolved peacefully through dialogue, and Chile regretted the Council's inability to support the resolution due to the use of the veto. The Council had not fulfilled its responsibility."
- China – On 2 March, Foreign Ministry spokesperson Qin Gang stated that China condemned the recent extremist violence in the country and urged all parties to resolve their internal disputes peacefully. China respected Ukraine's independence, sovereignty and territorial integrity. He urged all sides to find a solution through dialogue on the basis of international law and the norms governing international relations.

On 4 March, China's paramount leader and General Secretary of the Chinese Communist Party Xi Jinping, in a telephone conversation with Vladimir Putin, expressed his confidence in Putin's ability to reach a political solution through negotiations with all involved parties. He stated that China supports the propositions and mediation efforts of the international community towards easing the situation.
On 21 November, the acting director of the Chinese Foreign Ministry's European-Central Asian Affairs department, Gui Congyou, told Russian media: "We are against any nationality gaining independence through referendums. As far as Crimea is concerned, it has very special features. We know well the history of Crimea's affiliation. ... China reacts with full understanding to the challenges and threats Russia has faced in connection with the Ukrainian issue and supports Moscow's approach to its settlement."

- Colombia – The Foreign Ministry, on behalf of the government, released a press release stating "deep concern about the situation in Ukraine" while also deploring the "acts of violence that have taken place in the last couple of days". In the same press statement, Colombia urged the Government of Ukraine to "guarantee security, human rights, and the fundamental liberties of its citizens".
- Cuba – Foreign Minister Bruno Rodriguez condemned what he called "the hypocrisy, the double standards and the aggression" of Washington and NATO over the ouster of Yanukovich and warned against any attempt to extend NATO's reach to Russia's borders which he considered to be a flagrant violation of international law and the UN Charter and a threat to peace, security and global stability.
- Czech Republic – Foreign Minister Lubomír Zaorálek said on 1 March, "I unambiguously reject and condemn the steps taken by the Russian Federation over the recent days. ... Russia has committed, not only to respect Ukraine's territorial integrity and sovereignty, but also to guarantee them." He also said it reminded him of the 1968 Warsaw Pact invasion of Czechoslovakia. On 6 April 2014, President of the Czech Republic, Miloš Zeman said in an interview for Czech radio that the EU should impose the toughest sanctions on Russia as "at the moment Russia would decide to widen its territorial expansion to the Ukrainian east, this will become really serious as this would trigger a chain reaction". But he also expressed an opinion that Crimea will not be returned to Ukraine in the foreseeable future. Czech President Zeman also said: "Even though I understand the interests of Crimea's Russian-speaking majority, which was annexed to Ukraine by Khrushchev, we have our experience with the 1968 Russian military invasion."
- Denmark – Foreign Minister Martin Lidegaard stated on 2 March that, "This is a partial invasion of Ukraine by Russia". He made it clear that Denmark is working closely with the rest of EU and is preparing a condemning statement. He also called for Russia to respect international law.
- Estonia – Foreign Minister Urmas Paet stated on 1 March that, "The Russian parliament's decision to authorise the use of troops in Ukraine is a clear threat to Ukraine's sovereignty and territorial integrity," and that Russia's "... military threats and actions against Ukraine must stop." He called for the Ukrainian leadership to pursue all actions to reduce tensions and restore societal unity. Estonian President Toomas Hendrik Ilves stated that the annexation was "done too quickly and professionally not to have been planned far in advance" and said that the failure of the Budapest Memorandum "may have far-reaching implications for generations. I don't know what country in the future would ever give up its nuclear weapons in exchange for a security guarantee."
- Finland – Foreign Minister Erkki Tuomioja stated on 1 March, that Russia is implementing a military takeover of Crimean territory and by doing so Russia is violating several international treaties and laws.
- France – The representative of the Ministry of Foreign Affairs, Romain Nadal, expressed his concerns on events in Crimea and reminded the foreign minister Laurent Fabius repeatedly called upon to preserve the unity and integrity of Ukraine.
- Georgia – On 1 March, President Giorgi Margvelashvili called on the international community "not to allow new conflict in Europe and to use all the available means in order to avert possible aggression and to preserve sovereignty and territorial integrity of Ukraine."

On 11 March the President further stated that "The failure of the international community to punish Russia for its 2008 invasion of Georgia has let Moscow think it can get away with seizing Ukraine's Crimea region".
On 6 March, the Parliament of Georgia adopted the resolution on supporting sovereignty and territorial integrity of Ukraine and strongly condemned forceful actions against sovereign Ukraine by the Russian Federation as well as all other actions carried out in violation of basic principles of international law. The resolution emphasized that "the recent aggressive acts of the Russian Federation against the sovereignty and territorial integrity of Ukraine, including the use of military units on the territory of Ukraine in violation of provisions of the bilateral agreements and the threat of large scale military aggression, pose a serious threat not only to friendly Ukraine, but also to Georgia and the entire Europe."

- Germany – Chancellor Angela Merkel called Russia's actions "unacceptable" and stated that their doings would break international law. Merkel said that Russia accepted the independence of Ukraine in 1994 and is now not honoring the Budapest Memorandum on Security Assurances. In a policy statement delivered to the Bundestag, she stated that "Ukraine's territorial integrity is not negotiable". She was reported saying that Putin "lives in a different world" while talking with Barack Obama via phone. Chancellor Merkel also stated "The so-called referendum..., the declaration of independence ..., and the absorption into the Russian Federation (were), in our firm opinion,...against international law" and that it was "shameful" for Russia to compare the independence of Kosovo with the referendum on the Russian annexation of Crimea. In March 2015, after talks with Petro Poroshenko, Angela Merkel remarked that the annexation was in violation of international law, and therefore it's Germany's goal to restore the Crimean peninsula to Ukraine.
- Holy See – Pope Francis appealed to the international community "to support any initiative for dialogue and harmony."
- Hungary – In a statement issued 1 March, Ministry of Foreign Affairs expressed concern about the situation on the Crimean peninsula. The Ministry noted that the Visegrád Four Foreign Ministers had asked both the Kyiv government leaders and the Donetsk region's political leaders to abstain from provocative steps that may heighten tension and lead to violence. Hungarian government's reaction was criticized at home for being soft on Russia because of a recent deal Prime Minister Viktor Orbán had made with Russia to expand Paks Nuclear Power Plant. Additionally, Foreign Minister János Martonyi reassured ethnic Hungarians in Ukraine that Hungary would protect their interests.
- Iceland – Iceland condemned the actions of the Russian Federation regarding Crimea and expressed its full support to the Ukrainian people, Icelandic Minister for Foreign Affairs Gunnar Bragi Sveinsson told reporters in Kyiv on Saturday, 22 March 2014.
- India – The Indian government took a relatively balanced position on the situation in Ukraine. India said in its official statement that it hoped for a peaceful resolution to Ukraine's internal issues, and stated that there are legitimate Russian as well as other interests involved. It hoped that a satisfactory solution could be reached through discussion. The Ministry of External Affairs asked its nationals, particularly students, to leave the Donetsk and Luhansk regions in eastern Ukraine, which were witnessing frequent violent clashes. It also advised citizens in other parts of eastern and southern Ukraine to remain vigilant about their personal safety and security, and warned Indian travelers to be cautious and avoid non-essential travel to Ukraine. According to officials, there were about 1000 non-resident Indians living in the affected regions.

On 11 December 2014 Crimean Head of the Republic Sergey Aksyonov signed a memorandum of cooperation between the Republic of Crimea and "Indian business people" during his first foreign visit. In response (to this visit) Ukrainian President Petro Poroshenko remarked that (by allowing this visit) India was standing aside from "the rest of the civilization" and had "more attention to money" then "the value" of Aksyonov's visit.

- Indonesia – The Indonesian Foreign Minister Marty Natalegawa, issued a statement expressing Indonesia's deep concern to the situation in Ukraine. He described the situation in Ukraine as "an international crisis which threatens not only the sovereignty and territorial integrity of Ukraine, but also risks raising tensions in the relations between the affected countries." Indonesia respects the sovereignty of Ukraine and called for all parties to resolve the issue through peaceful means. Indonesia also called the UN Security Council, including Permanent Members "to shoulder its responsibility in accordance to the Charter of the United Nations in maintaining international peace and security in responding to the crisis in Ukraine." The statement also suggested that the United Nations send a special envoy to the Secretary General to the affected areas.
- Ireland – Tánaiste and Minister for Foreign Affairs and Trade Eamon Gilmore expressed concern regarding the developments in Ukraine. He called on the Russian Federation to abide by international law and to respect Ukraine's territorial integrity and independence, called on all parties "to work to ensure that, through dialogue, all legitimate concerns can be addressed", and stressed the need for all sides to "avoid any provocation", the latter expression echoing language used by both Russia Today and the European Parliament in relation to Kyiv's abolition of the regional status of minority languages, including Russian, as well as a recent attack on the headquarters of the Communist Party of Ukraine.
- Israel – The Foreign Ministry's 5 March statement said, "Israel is following with great concern the events in Ukraine, is anxious for peace for all its citizens, and hopes that the situation will not escalate to a loss of human life. Israel hopes the crisis in Ukraine will be handled through diplomatic means and will be resolved peacefully."
- Italy – Italian Prime Minister Matteo Renzi accused Putin of having committed "an unacceptable violation". On 19 March, during a speech in the Chamber of Deputies, Renzi stated that the Crimean status referendum was illegal and that the G8 countries must start cooperating to solve the crisis and prevent a return to the Cold War. The Foreign Ministry's statement said, "Italy and its European partners strongly condemn the violation of Ukrainian sovereignty and territorial integrity and call on Russia to immediately withdraw its armed forces. They view the political-diplomatic channel as the only way to resolve the crisis."
- Japan – The Foreign Ministry issued a statement in which it said that the authorisation on Saturday "for use of the armed forces of the Russian Federation in Ukraine heightens the tension in the region and would harm the peace and stability of the international community," as well that "In this regard, Japan expresses grave anxiety and concern over the decision. ... Japan strongly expects that the situation in Ukraine will be settled in a peaceful manner and strongly urges all the parties concerned to behave with maximum self-restraint and responsibility, to fully observe the relevant international laws," it concluded.
- Jordan – On 15 March, Jordan voted for the resolution condemning the 16 March referendum. The Jordanian ambassador, Zeid Ra'ad Zeid Al-Hussein stating he had voted in favour of the resolution out of respect for Ukraine's sovereignty, territorial integrity and independence, as well as for the principle of non-interference in internal affairs. Underlining the importance of adherence to the United Nations Charter, especially Article 1 on peaceful dispute settlement, he said Crimea was under Ukrainian sovereignty.
- Kazakhstan – On 3 March, Kazakhstan's Ministry of Foreign Affairs stated that Kazakhstan is deeply concerned with the current situation in Ukraine. The statement urged all sides to renounce the use of power and to resolve the crisis through negotiations, "based on respect towards the fundamental principles of international law." However President Kassym-Jomart Tokayev, who succeeded long running President Nursultan Nazarbayev in 2019, commented during a German state visit that he did not believe Crimea was annexed, preferring to use the word "accession", prompting condemnation from the Ukrainian Ministry of Foreign Affairs.
- Kyrgyzstan – Kyrgyzstan viewed the interim Ukrainian government as legitimate and stated concern over the crisis, and condemned any activities aimed at destabilizing the situation in Ukraine. On 16 March, the Foreign Ministry released another statement "Kyrgyz Republic, as before, holds the opinion that unconsidered actions and corruption of former Ukrainian authorities led to the current crisis and the deaths of dozens of innocent people. At the same time, the results of the referendum in the Crimea from 16 March this year represent the will of absolute majority of the population of the Autonomous Republic. It is an objective reality, despite the polar estimates that have been given to this referendum."
- Latvia – President of Latvia, Speaker of the parliament, Prime Minister and Foreign Minister issued a joint statement stating that "Latvia strongly stands for the territorial integrity of Ukraine and is of the opinion that any measures aimed at splitting Ukrainian society and questioning the territorial integrity of the country must be condemned in the strongest terms possible." Foreign Minister Edgars Rinkēvičs said, "The Crimea scenario resembles the occupation of the Baltic states by the USSR in 1940. History repeats itself, first as tragedy, second as farce." A 28 August statement from the Ministry of Foreign Affairs said "Latvia condemns the invasion of Ukrainian territory by armed forces of the Russian Federation. This represents open aggression against the sovereignty and territorial integrity of Ukraine and undermines the fundamental principles of international law."
- Liechtenstein – On 5 March Foreign Minister Aurelia Frick in the name of the Liechtenstein Government expressed hope for peaceful solution of the Crimean conflict and called for all parties to support the sovereignty of Ukraine.
- Lithuania – The Foreign Ministry announced that it had called the Russian Ambassador to Lithuania to discuss the situation in Ukraine. President Dalia Grybauskaitė said that Russia was dangerous. "After Ukraine will be Moldova, and after Moldova will be different countries. They are trying to rewrite the borders after the Second World War in Europe."
- Republic of Macedonia – The Foreign Ministry issued a statement expressing its growing concern over the escalation of violence in Ukraine. It called for undertaking of all necessary measures for urgent easing of tensions, while underscoring the need for establishing political dialogue about all problems citizens of Ukraine face, the resolution of which necessitates involvement of all stakeholders. It also called for moderation and responsibility.
- Malaysia – Malaysia through its Minister of Foreign Affairs views with deep concern the developments in Ukraine, particularly the situation in the Crimean peninsula. Given Malaysia's friendly relations with Russia and Ukraine, the country urge both to work towards a peaceful resolution of the issues between them. Malaysia also hopes that both sides would adopt a moderate approach and find a mutually acceptable solution. The interest, welfare and security of the people of Ukraine must be given top-most priority while taking into account the implications on the overall stability and peace in the region. Malaysia also supports all peaceful efforts including international diplomatic initiatives aimed at resolving the crisis situation in Ukraine. All parties involved must respect the rule of law, act responsibly and aim towards finding a peaceful settlement.
- Mexico – On 3 March 2014, The Secretariat of Foreign Affairs issued a press release expressing Mexico's deep concern at the deteriorating situation in Ukraine and its support of calls for respect for Ukraine's national unity and territorial integrity, in accordance with the UN Charter and international law.
- Moldova – On 2 March 2014, President Nicolae Timofti stated "Moldova underlines the importance to observe Ukraine's sovereignty and territorial integrity and not to allow violation of the international law principles.
- Montenegro – On 5 March 2014, Government of Montenegro issued a statement condemning "blatant violation of the sovereignty and territorial integrity of Ukraine and the aggression of Russian armed forces".
- New Zealand – On 3 March 2014, Prime Minister of New Zealand John Key speaking on the morning news and talk show Breakfast, referred to the rising tensions in Ukraine as "deeply concerning". The Prime Minister further stated that while Russia has very real interests in Ukraine and Crimea specifically, he agreed with the United States condemnation of Russia's actions, stressing that it would, "...be a disaster if there was a major problem in the Ukraine," including that the use of force was in nobody's interests.
- Nicaragua – On 27 March, Nicaragua officially recognized Crimea as a part of Russia. In November 2020, the Nicaraguan government announced establishing an honorary consulate in Crimea.
- Nigeria – U. Joy Ogwo, Nigeria's representative on the UN Security Council, voted in favor of the US-backed resolution condemning 16 March referendum; she had voted in favour because the text embodied principles enshrined in the United Nations Charter, which obliged member states to settle disputes through peaceful means. Pointing out that the draft resolution was not a country-specific text, she said the pacific settlement of the territorial dispute between Nigeria and Cameroon through the International Court of Justice should serve as a beacon. Nigeria opposed unilateral actions aimed at altering a country's configuration.
- North Korea – On 15 March, North Korean ambassador to Russia Kim Yong-jae expressed support for Russia's position.
- Norway – The Ministry of Foreign Affairs condemned the Russian military escalation in the Crimea together with the NATO countries. "The Russian authorities must immediately meet the Ukrainian request for dialogue to resolve the crisis without violence," said the Norwegian Foreign Minister Børge Brende.
- Pakistan – Foreign Ministry spokesperson Tasnim Aslam, in a weekly press briefing, expressed hope that the political crisis in Ukraine would be resolved through peaceful means and stated that talks and diplomacy were the only option to calm down the situation.
- Philippines – In a statement by the Philippine Department of Foreign Affairs, the Philippines expressed "deep concerns regarding developments in Ukraine" and called all parties "to exercise restraint, not to escalate through the use of force, and follow obligations under international law." The statement also "urges all parties to resolve the crisis through dialogue." In a separate statement on 4 March, the department also raised the alert level in Ukraine to Level 2 "in view of ongoing tensions in that country" and advised Filipinos in Ukraine "to restrict non-essential movements, avoid public places, closely monitor developments, and prepare for possible evacuation."
- Poland – On 1 March 2014, Poland "strongly appeal[ed] for respecting Ukraine's territorial integrity, and observing international law, including fundamental principles of the Organization for Security and Cooperation in Europe...We urge states-signatories to the Budapest Memorandum of December 1994, which gives Ukraine security assurances, to respect and fulfil their commitments," said the MFA statement.

On 6 March 2014, Poland's Minister of Defence Tomasz Siemoniak announced the arrival of 12 American F-16 fighter jets with 300 personnel per Poland's request at NATO, which was granted by the Secretary of Defense Chuck Hagel. The situation in Ukraine, he said at a press conference, is extremely serious. The changing of guaranteed borders is not acceptable, neither is the blocking of the OBWE observers in Crimea. The F-16 aviation detachment AvDet is scheduled to station at the Air Force bases in Łask and Powidz. Poland's President Bronisław Komorowski visited the Air Force base in Łask with Siemoniak on 11 March and pronounced the urgent necessity for further military spending on the multi-purpose F-16 programme. Polish Prime Minister Donald Tusk called for change in EU energy policy as Germany's dependence on Russian gas poses risks for Europe. On 11 March Tusk announced that the current situation in Crimea is only a phase in an ongoing crisis, but Poland cannot accept the territorial disintegration of sovereign Ukraine. On 29 August Polish Ministry of Foreign Affairs officially recognized "offensive action of the Russian armed forces in the southern regions of Donetsk oblast, in particular in the vicinity of the town of Nowoazowsk" as an aggression by international law.

- Romania – On 2 March, President Traian Basescu said that any Russian military presence in Ukraine, without Ukraine's approval and beyond the limits of bilateral accords, would be seen as an act of aggression. On 6 March, the Romanian president took a stronger stance, declaring that 'what Russia has done in Ukraine is an aggression against that country.". He further stated that Romania, which has the largest minority in Ukraine aside from Russia (cca. 400.000 Romanian speaking Ukrainian citizens), should play an active role and do more in supporting US and European negotiations with Russia.
- Rwanda – On 15 March, Rwandan ambassador Eugène-Richard Gasana voted a resolution in the UN Security Council condemning the 16 March referendum. He said the timing of action on the draft resolution was not productive. Now was the time for frank dialogue, rather than rhetoric that would isolate a country. The situations in Ukraine and Crimea had unfolded rapidly, and the pressure exerted by some countries had diverted attention away from careful analysis of their root causes. While Rwanda had still voted in favour of the text, which embodied important principles such as sovereignty, unity and territorial integrity, it urged Ukraine to launch an inclusive national dialogue, and the international community to help avoid further deterioration of the situation.
- Serbia – On November 5th, the Foreign Ministry issued a statement that it was "it once again wishes to reiterate that Serbia supports the territorial integrity and sovereignty of Ukraine." The statement by the Ministry of Foreign Affairs says that Serbia also supports the continuation of the peace process, with firm belief that only dialogue can lead to a solution in accordance with international law and with the respect for the UN Charter.
- Singapore – On 5 March, Foreign Minister K Shanmugam spoke in parliament outlining Singapore's official position: "We strongly object to any unprovoked invasion of a sovereign country under any pretext or excuse. Russian troops should not be in Ukraine in breach of international law. The sovereignty and territorial integrity of Ukraine must be respected. International law must be respected. There can be no qualifications to this."
- Slovenia – Prime Minister Alenka Bratušek said that all has to be done to prevent a military conflict to occur in Ukraine, while the ministry of foreign affairs offered to become a mediator for the EU.
- South Africa – On 2 March, spokesperson Nelson Kgwete stated that "The South African government would like to express its deep concern about the unfolding political situation in Ukraine" and that "We will continue to monitor the situation and encourage international diplomatic efforts meant to produce a lasting peaceful solution".
- South Korea – On 15 March, the representative of the Republic of Korea to the UN Security Council Oh Joon voted in favor of a US sponsored resolution condemning the 16 March referendum. He elaborated that he "had voted in favour of the text, which embodied important principles such as sovereignty, territorial integrity and unity. Those principles should be respected. Today's failure to adopt the text would not close the window to a diplomatic solution, he emphasized."
- Spain – The Ministry of Foreign Affairs and Cooperation released a statement in support of the new Ukrainian government, saying the following: "The Spanish government is concerned about the situation in Ukraine, which remains uncertain and unstable. The current tension in Crimea is especially concerning". The government also expressed its "full support for the territorial integrity of Ukraine", and urged all actors to "cooperate in finding a solution, while dismissing any use of force".
- Sri Lanka – The Sri Lankan government described Yanukovych's removal as unconstitutional and expressed regret. Sri Lanka considered Russia's concerns as justified and welcomed any attempts to de-escalate the tension.
- Sweden – Prime Minister Fredrik Reinfeldt said 2 March in an interview on Sveriges Radio:"It's somewhat understandable that Russia is acting on concerns about the Russian minority of Crimea and eastern Ukraine, but not in the way they're doing it. There are of course methods for talking to the Ukrainian government and calm down the situation in that way." In an interview on 19 March, he said that the Russian leadership "are making as many errors as they can, breaking international law and the collective security structure we have built since the end of the Cold War. We ought to feel very worried about that." Foreign Minister Carl Bildt tweeted on 1 March, "Russian military intervention in Ukraine is clearly against international law and principles of European security." He added in an interview in the evening the same day, "There is no doubt that what is happening now is a scarcely camouflaged Russian takeover of Crimea"
- Syria – The former Assad regime led by under President Bashar al-Assad had expressed support for Putin’s efforts to “restore security and stability in the friendly country of Ukraine.” The Assad regime had officially recognized Crimea as a part of Russia. Following the fall of the Assad regime a decade later, Syrian–Ukrainian ties were restored in 2025. The two countries began improving relations in April 2026, and Syria, under President Ahmed al-Sharaa, affirmed that it respected Ukraine’s territorial integrity.
- Turkey – Foreign Minister Ahmet Davutoğlu stated on 28 February that "Turkey attaches importance to democracy and democracy-based political stability in Ukraine's future" and that "Crimea is important for Turkey as it is Turkey's door to Ukraine and it is also important for our Tatar compatriots." Turkish President Abdullah Gül stated on 5 March that the problems must be solved within international law and with respect to Ukraine's political union and borders. Turkish Prime Minister Recep Tayyip Erdoğan said: "Unfortunately, throughout history, the right of the Crimean Tatar people to live in dignity in their own homeland was undermined with collective deportations and repression. Today we are witnessing the illegal annexation of the Crimea and other regrettable events," after meeting with Crimean leaders, International Business Times reported Monday, 3 August.
- United Kingdom – The Foreign Secretary William Hague said he was "deeply concerned" at the escalation of tensions and the decision of the Russian parliament to authorise military action. He also said "This action is a potentially grave threat to the sovereignty, independence and territorial integrity of Ukraine. We condemn any act of aggression against Ukraine".

On 2 March 2014, British Prime Minister David Cameron announced that government officials were planning to boycott the 2014 Winter Paralympics in Sochi in response to the situation in Crimea, while Prince Edward cancelled plans to travel to Sochi for the Games "on the advice of government." These decisions did not affect Great Britain's participation in the Games. Cameron also said "No amount of sham and perverse democratic process or skewed historical references can make up for the fact that this is an incursion into a sovereign state and a land grab of part of its territory with no respect for the law of that country or for international law."

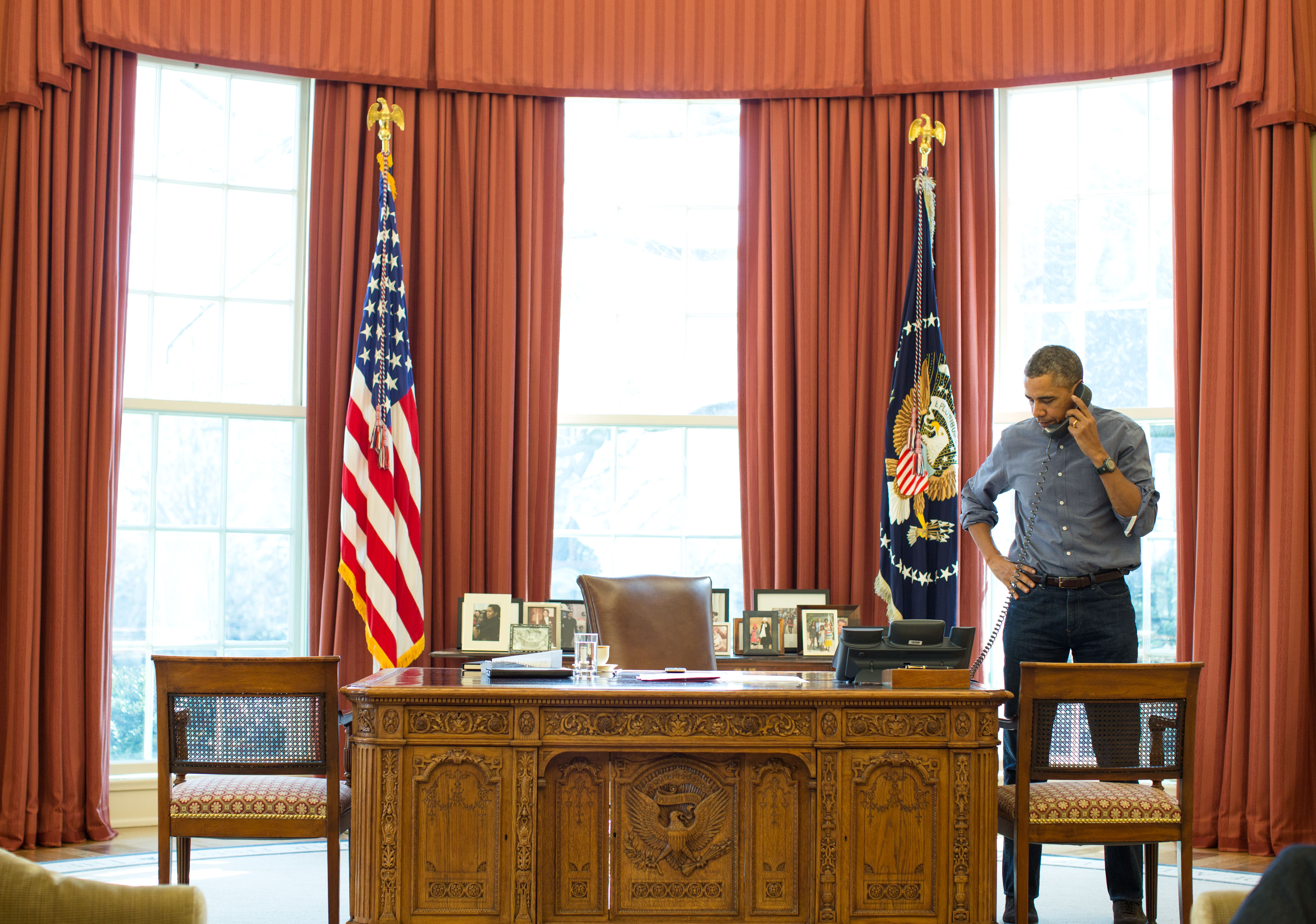
U.S. President Barack Obama speaks with Russian President Vladimir Putin on the telephone in the Oval Office, 1 March 2014

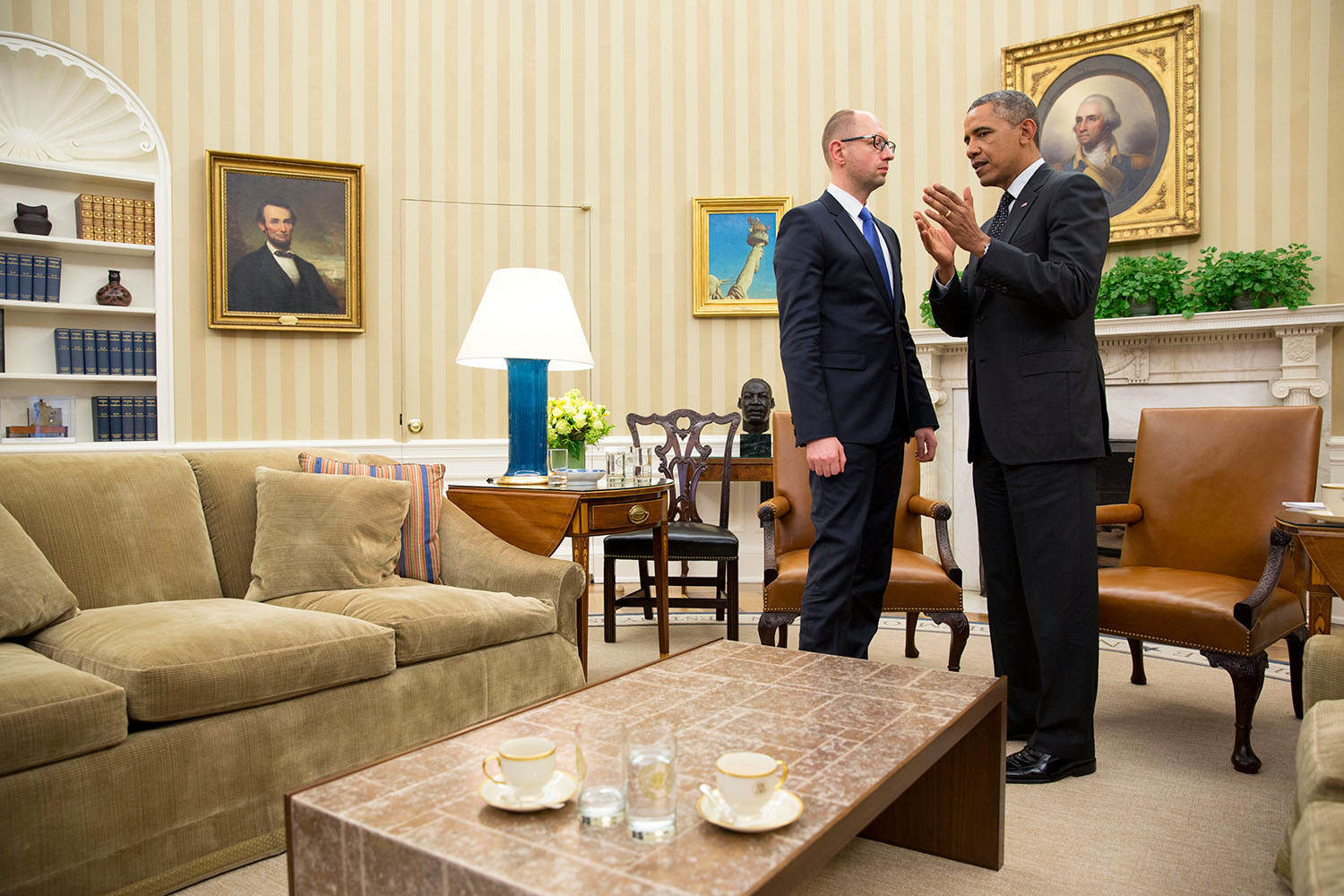
President Barack Obama talks with Ukrainian Prime Minister Arseniy Yatsenyuk at the conclusion of their bilateral meeting in the Oval Office, 12 March 2014

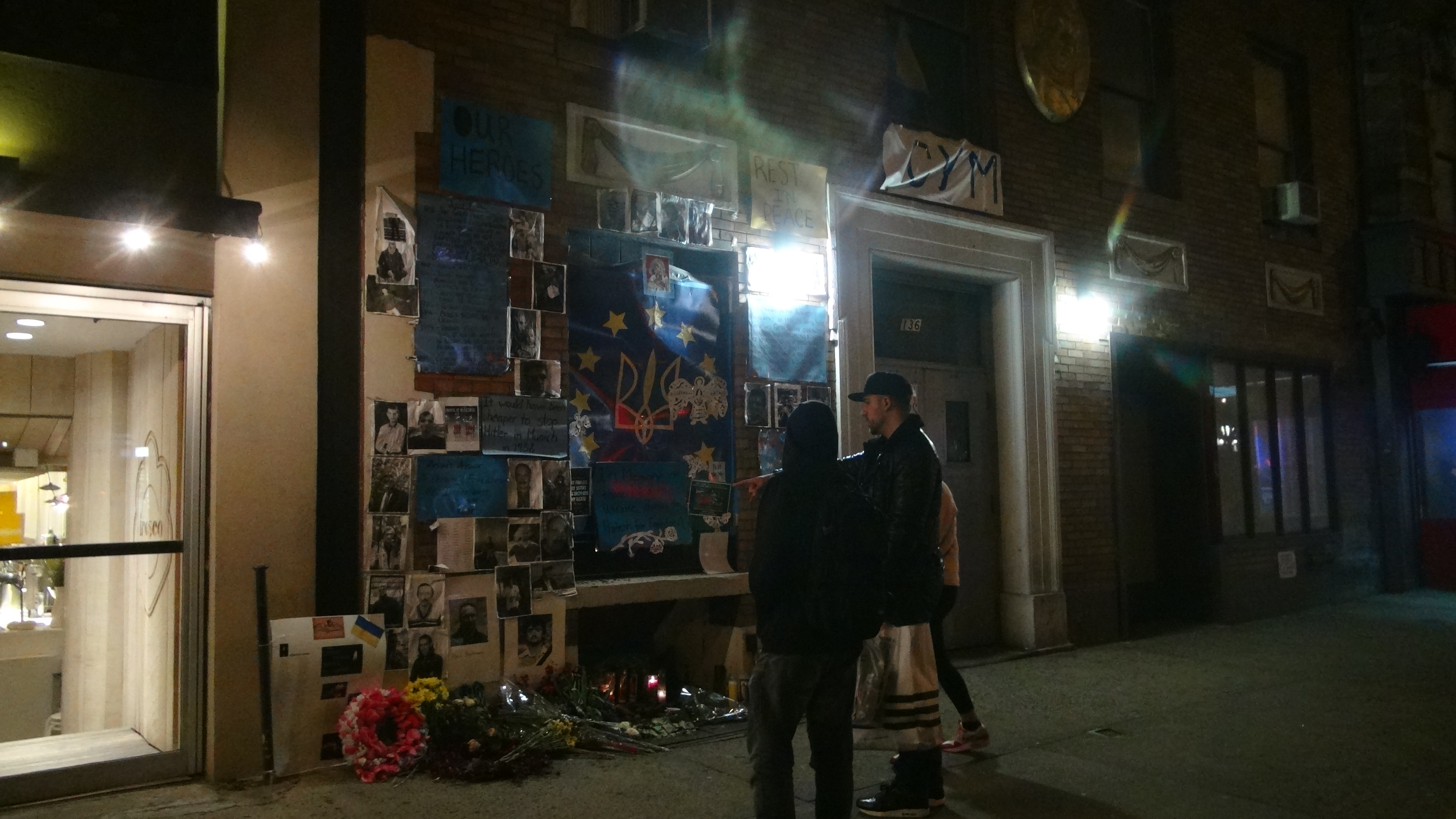
Ukraine-honoring display in the New York City pictured on 8 April 2014, on 2nd Avenue by St Marks Place, near the Ukrainian National Home

- United States – On 28 February, President Barack Obama's statement was released warning Russia not to intervene in Crimea. The statement said that President Obama is "deeply concerned by reports of military movements taken by the Russian Federation inside of Ukraine." It added that "any violation of Ukraine's sovereignty and territorial integrity would be deeply destabilizing, which is not in the interest of Ukraine, Russia, or Europe" and that it would be "a clear violation of Russia's commitment to respect the independence and sovereignty and borders of Ukraine, and of international laws."

On 1 March, Obama held a phone conversation with Putin and said that the Russian invasion was a "violation of Ukrainian sovereignty and territorial integrity ... [and a] breach of international law." He warned of "greater political and economic isolation" and threatened to withdraw the United States from the 40th G8 summit chaired by Russia.
Secretary of State John Kerry then labeled and condemned Russia's "invasion" of Ukraine on 2 March in an interview for Face the Nation. He called it an "incredible act of aggression," and said that "you just don't in the 21st century behave in 19th century fashion by invading another country on completely trumped up pretext."
On 3 March, National Security Council spokeswoman Caitlin Hayden announced that the United States would not send a presidential delegation to the 2014 Winter Paralympics in Sochi (which was to be led by Tammy Duckworth), "in addition to other measures we are taking in response to the situation in Ukraine." As with the British boycott effort, it did not affect the country's participation in the Games themselves.
On 6 March, Obama signed Executive Order 13660, Blocking Property of Certain Persons Contributing to the Situation in Ukraine, authorizing sanctions against persons who, being determined by the Secretary of the Treasury in consultation with the Secretary of State, have violated or assisted in the violation of Ukraine's sovereignty.
On 17 March, Obama signed Executive Order 13661, Blocking Property of Additional Persons Contributing to the Situation in Ukraine, which expanded the scope of the previous sanctions imposed by EO 13660, to include the freezing of certain Russian government officials' assets in the US and blocking their entry into the US.
The 113th United States Congress considered several different pieces of legislation that would offer the Ukraine different levels of loan guarantees, aid, and apply sanctions "against anyone deemed by the president to have undermined Ukraine's security or independence, or to have engaged in corruption in Ukraine or Russia." Those bills included the bill To provide for the costs of loan guarantees for Ukraine (H.R. 4152; 113th Congress), the Support for the Sovereignty, Integrity, Democracy, and Economic Stability of Ukraine Act of 2014 (S. 2124; 113th Congress), and the Ukraine Support Act (H.R. 4278; 113th Congress). All three bills were introduced and considered in March 2014.
On 3 April, the United States Department of Energy informed the Russian state-run nuclear corporation Rosatom on suspension of several peaceful nuclear cooperation projects.
In 2016 Obama explained his overall reaction: Ukraine is a core Russian interest but not an American one, so Russia will always be able to maintain escalatory dominance there, and added: "The fact is that Ukraine, which is a non-NATO country, is going to be vulnerable to military domination by Russia no matter what we do".

- Uruguay – On 20 February, the Foreign Affairs Ministry condemned the acts of violence and called the stakeholders to solve differences by the means of a dialogue.
- Uzbekistan – The Foreign Ministry released a statement saying that Russia's actions in Crimea "create real threats to the sovereignty and territorial integrity of the country" and "cannot but cause deep anxiety and concern in Uzbekistan."
- Venezuela – On 7 March, the Foreign Ministry released a statement which said President Nicolás Maduro "condemns the coup perpetrated by extremist groups in Ukraine following an attrition strategy promoted from abroad by the government of the United States and its NATO allies." It further stated, "the installation in Kiev of de facto authorities not only threatens Ukraine's national unity, but the stability of the entire region as it places in danger Ukrainian citizens of Russian origin and the Russian Federation's own sovereignty."
- Vietnam – On 5 March, Le Hai Binh, a spokesman for the Foreign Ministry of Vietnam, stated, "We hope that stability will soon be restored in Ukraine and that all issues will be resolved by law, for the sake of Ukrainian people, and of peace and development in the region and the world over."
- Zimbabwe – On 22 December 2014 Zimbabwe's as Minister of the Environment Saviour Kasukuwere became the first non-Russian politician to visit Crimea since its March 2014 annexation "to offer advice on how to deal with international sanctions". Zimbabwe had also voted against the March 2014 United Nations General Assembly Resolution 68/262 aimed at recognizing Crimea within Ukraine's borders and underscored the invalidity of the 2014 Crimean referendum.

=== Joint statements ===
- Lithuania / Poland – Presidents of the two countries called for NATO consultations in accordance with Article 4 of its treaty claiming Russia was executing military maneuvers in Kaliningrad, close to both their borders.

=== Partially recognized states ===
- Transnistria – Transnistria's government asked the Russian government to make Transnistria become a part of Russia. Irina Kubanskikh, a spokeswoman for the Transnistrian parliament, said that the region's public bodies had "appealed to the Russian Federation leadership to examine the possibility of extending to Transnistria the legislation, currently under discussion in the State Duma, on granting Russian citizenship and admitting new subjects into Russia."
- Abkhazia – The President of Abkhazia Alexander Ankvab said, "This is a classic example of when the will of the people is above to all" and "Abkhazia respects the will of Crimeans, [we] support and recognize their fateful choice [and] a nationwide solution is based not only on the historical past but on the modern political realities."
- South Ossetia – On 5 March, Minister of Foreign Affairs David G. Sanakoyev released a statement blaming the unrest on the coup in Kiev carried out by "extremists" and U.S. interference. He further noted: "This unrest raised discontent of predominantly Russian speaking population of the Autonomous Republic of Crimea and Eastern regions of Ukraine who did not want to have the same scenario in the places of their residence. People of South Ossetia understand what is happening in Ukraine more than anybody else. South Ossetia suffered consequences of Georgian nationalism in August 2008, supported by clearly fascist Ukrainian organizations such as UNA-UNSO. It should be said that we express full solidarity with Russian Federation in support of the compatriots in Ukraine to prevent escalation and bloodshed."
- Kosovo – The Ministry of Foreign Affairs condemned what it termed the "occupation of Ukrainian territory, and the violation of Ukrainian sovereignty and territorial integrity in full contravention of Russia's obligations under the UN Charter, the Helsinki Final Act and the 1994 Budapest Memorandum."
- Taiwan – On 4 March, the Ministry of Foreign Affairs issued a statement that read: "The ROC government calls on all parties concerned to respect Ukraine's sovereignty, territorial integrity, political independence and democracy. We urge parties to begin negotiations as soon as possible, so as to peacefully resolve disputes in accordance with international law, prevent tensions from rising further, and work together to advance peace and stability in the region."

== International organizations ==
- Council of Europe PACE's Standing Committee expressed its full support for the "territorial integrity and national unity of Ukraine" on 7 March.
- European Union (EU) – On 1 March, High Representative of the Union for Foreign Affairs and Security Policy Catherine Ashton stated that the EU "deplores" what it called Russia's decision to use military action in Ukraine, describing it as an "unwarranted escalation of tensions." She called on "all sides to decrease the tensions [sic] immediately through dialogue, in full respect of Ukrainian and international law." She added that: "The unity, sovereignty and territorial integrity of Ukraine must be respected at all times and by all sides. Any violation of these principles is unacceptable. More than ever, restraint and sense of responsibility are needed."
  - The President of the European Parliament, Martin Schulz said that who could have imagined "that war could become a genuine possibility in a country which shares a border with the European Union?"
- The Organisation for Economic Co-operation and Development (OECD) suspended the accession process of Russia on 13 March and began strengthening ties with Ukraine.
- The Organization of Islamic Cooperation expressed concern about the "security and well-being" of the Muslim Crimean Tatar community. "Any recurrence of the past suffering of the Crimean Tatars who were expelled from their homeland in Crimea in the 20th Century should not be allowed. It is of the utmost importance for the OIC that the right of citizenship, lives, religious and cultural heritage and property should be safeguarded. It is the firm belief of the OIC that in the 21st century, constructive dialogue, peaceful and good neighborly relations should be the norm for the members of the international community."
- Organization for Security and Co-operation in Europe (OSCE) – A diplomatic group was dispatched by the OSCE consisting of official representative and a head of the OSCE Commissar on affairs of national minorities. Observers of the OSCE made attempts to get inside the Crimean peninsula, however they were held up and made to return from two checkpoints by uniformed militiamen belonging to an unidentified organization. The contingent consisted of 42 people from 22 countries and were led by Hungarian Lieutenant Colonel Gábor Ács. The mission arrived in Ukraine on 6 March and had a mandate to work in Crimea till 12 March. OSCE Parliamentary Assembly condemned Russian actions in Ukraine twice, in 2014 "Baku Declaration" and in 2015 "Helsinki Declaration".
- NATO – On 2 March, Secretary General Anders Fogh Rasmussen convened the North Atlantic Council due to what it called Russia's military action and President Vladimir Putin's alleged threats against Ukraine. The North Atlantic Council condemned what it called Russia's military escalation in Crimea and called it a breach of international law. It also called on Russia to respect its obligations under the UN Charter, the Budapest Memorandum of 1994, the Treaty on Friendship and Cooperation between Russia and Ukraine of 1997 and the legal framework regulating the presence of the Russian Black Sea Fleet. Rasmussen called the annexation "the gravest threat to European security since the end of the Cold War."
- NB8 – On 7 March, member countries' Ministers of Foreign Affairs issued a joint statement with the Visegrad Group's Ministers of Foreign Affairs declaring that "against a European country an act of aggression has been committed by Russian military forces." They also condemned "the unprovoked violation of Ukrainian sovereignty and territorial integrity by the Russian Federation" and called on Russia "to immediately withdraw its armed forces to the areas of their permanent stationing, in accordance with the relevant agreements."
- United Nations (UN) – On 1 March, while members of the UN Security Council were meeting in an emergency closed-door session, a spokesman for UN Secretary-General Ban Ki-moon delivered a statement saying that he was "gravely concerned about the deterioration of the situation" in Ukraine and planned to speak shortly with Putin. The UN Security Council met on 28 February to discuss the situation; according to its president, the council agreed that it was important for all political actors in Ukraine to "exercise maximum restraint" and called for an "inclusive dialogue recognizing the diversity of Ukrainian society."

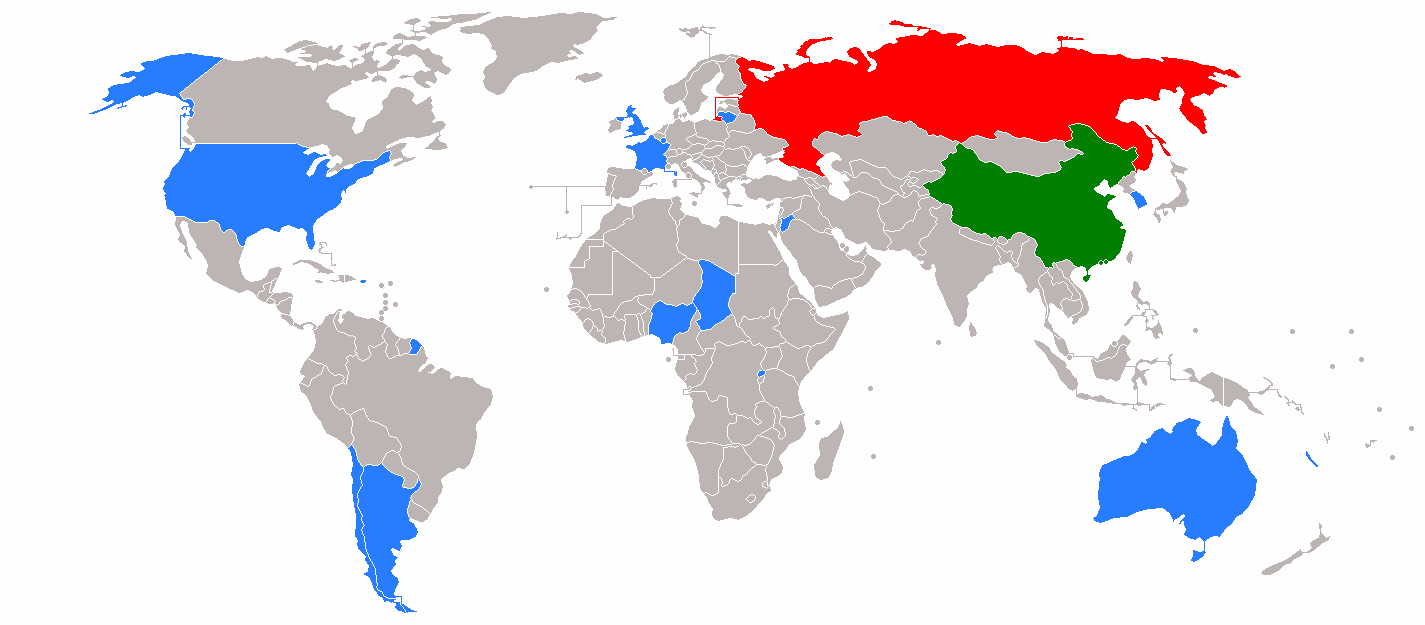
UN Security Council vote on a draft resolution condemning the 2014 Crimean referendum. Voted in favor of resolution Abstained Vetoed resolution

Results of the United Nations General Assembly vote about the territorial integrity of Ukraine. In favor Against Abstentions Absent Non-members

- Visegrád Group – On 4 March, the group issued a joint statement urging Russia to respect Ukraine's territorial integrity and for Ukraine to take into account its minority groups to not further break fragile relations. It urged Russia to act in full respect of what it called Ukrainian and international law and in line with the provisions of the 1994 Budapest Memorandum. "The Czech Republic, Hungary, Poland and Slovakia are appalled to witness a military intervention in 21st century Europe akin to their own experiences in 1956, 1968 and 1981."

== Non-governmental political parties ==
- Dutch People's Party for Freedom and Democracy MEP and president of the Liberal International Hans van Baalen stated: "The international community must condemn the Russian de facto intervention and must consider a strong reaction if Russia follows its example in Georgia. The USA and the EU must work closely together. The cost for Putin to violate international law will be high."
- Greek then-Leader of the Opposition and member of the Party of the European Left MP Alexis Tsipras (who would eventually serve as Prime Minister of Greece from 2015 to 2019) echoed Russian disinformation regarding alleged Nazism in Ukrainian government, stating in 21 March 2014 that "What is actually happening for the first time today is that, centering on Ukraine, the European Union supports a government with far-right and neo-Nazi elements, which violates its own country's constitution. In Ukraine, the European Union has denied its own precedent, when it imposed sanctions on Austria in 2000, because Jörg Haider's far-right participated in the government. And it is walking a Cold-War tightrope with Russia."
- The International Young Democrat Union issued a statement that read: "The IYDU strongly opposes the provocative, unlawful and aggressive behaviour of the Russian Federation. The incursion of Russian armed forces and the occupation of the Ukrainian territory constitutes a clear violation of the sovereignty and territorial integrity of Ukraine, in full contravention of Russia's obligations under the UN Charter, the Helsinki Final Act, its 1997 military basing agreement with Ukraine and the 1994 Budapest Memorandum. Under no circumstances can these actions be legitimised or justified."
- European People's Party President and Chairman of the EPP European Parliament group MEP Joseph Daul and Chairman of the Foreign Affairs Committee of the European Parliament MEP Elmar Brok issued a joint statement that read: "On behalf of the largest political family in the European Union, we strongly condemn the decision to deploy troops in Ukraine and we call on President Putin to stop any influx of Russian troops on the sovereign territory of Ukraine. It is despicable that Russia would use its military force and violate the territorial integrity of an independent state which is Ukraine. Russia's provocative actions risk a military confrontation and bloodshed which could be too big to contemplate. The invasion of Ukraine should stop now."
- The International Union of Socialist Youth issued a statement on 5 March that read: "IUSY remembers the victims of the past months' protests and condemns any further use of violence that could lead to a reescalation of the situation, especially the use of military force. IUSY calls upon all actors as for example Russia and the European Union to respect Ukraine's national sovereignty and to support the citizens of Ukraine to address the internal political challenges through peaceful, democratic and anti-fascist means and internal political processes."
- The Party of European Socialists released on 3 March advocating for an inclusive government in Ukraine, respect for its ethnic minorities, condemnation of the language law, among other things and that "the PES wants the EU to use all the diplomatic tools necessary to avoid a civil war at its Eastern border. We are concerned that no more innocent victims should suffer due to rising tensions and call for calm, restraint and mutual respect. The PES would like to see a role for OSCE Observers, and an increase in dialogue whereby all sides strive to find balanced solutions. We urge all parties involved to show full respect for international agreements, including the UN Charter, the 1997 military basing agreement with Ukraine, the Budapest Memorandum of 1994 and the OSCE Final Act. The Government in Kyiv should do everything possible to be inclusive, and a dialogue with Eastern and Southern interlocutors must be a priority. We call for a balanced solution respecting Ukraine's territorial integrity. All concerns Russia has with regards to the security and human rights situation in Ukraine can be addressed through negotiations or international monitoring. The EU should provide immediate financial and technical assistance to Ukraine's Government, as this will contribute to the stabilization of the region."
- President of the Socialists and Democrats Group in the European Parliament and Social Democratic Party of Austria MEP Hannes Swoboda stated: "We need to use all means possible to include Russia in genuine political dialogue. Russia must respect the territorial integrity and sovereignty of Ukraine – in line with its commitment to the 1994 Budapest Memorandum – but more threats against Russia will not speed this up. In return, Ukraine and its new leadership must reinstate legislation recognising and protecting minority languages and the rights of Russian-speakers in Ukraine. The Euromaidan protests offer the chance for a new Ukraine – one that must be built on unity, not further ethnic and linguistic division."
- The European Green Party issued a statement on 4 March that "expressed its solidarity with the people of Ukraine, and their fight for European orientation, democracy, peace and independence. Russia has invaded Crimea and is threatening an even broader invasion of Ukraine. The military control of Russian troops over the Crimean peninsula is a violation of Ukrainian sovereignty. Russia is blatantly ignoring its own treaty obligations, international law and its obligations under UN charters. We are highly alarmed by this aggression and call for it to end immediately."
- Union of Right Forces – On 27 February, the Russian party condemned the military intervention.

== Others ==
The International Workers' Association, an international group of anarcho-syndicalists, released a statement on behalf of its Russian section, that was also endorsed by other "internationalists" in Ukraine, Moldova, the United States and elsewhere, that condemned the crisis as a conflict between two "imperialist cliques" and concluded: "We will not succumb to nationalist intoxication. To hell with their state and 'nations,' their flags and offices! This is not our war, and we should not go on it, paying with our blood their palaces, bank accounts and the pleasure to sit in soft chairs of authorities. And if the bosses in Moscow, Kiev, Lviv, Kharkiv, Donetsk and Simferopol start this war, our duty is to resist it by all available means!"

The Fourth International, an international group of Trotskyist communist parties, approved a resolution that expressed support for the Maidan Revolution and condemned Russian actions in Ukraine, while also expressing mistrust in the new government of Ukraine. The resolution also asked for immediate cessation of hostilities, withdrawal of Russian troops from Ukraine, opposition of anti-social policies and neutrality of the Ukrainian state.

In March 2014, Mikhail Gorbachev defended the Crimean status referendum that led to Russia's annexation of Crimea. He noted that while Crimea was transferred from Russia to Ukraine in 1954, when both were part of the Soviet Union, the Crimean people had not been asked at the time, whereas in the 2014 referendum they had. After sanctions were placed on Russia as a result of the annexation, Gorbachev spoke out against them. His comments led to Ukraine banning him in 2016 from entering the country for five years. Gorbachev held a "complex and contradictory view" regarding the Russo-Ukrainian War, shaped by his belief (shared by most of his political generation in Russia) on the borders of the former Soviet Union and on the closeness of the Ukrainian and Russian people. The 2022 Russian invasion of Ukraine started in the last few months of Gorbachev's life, when he was suffering from a longtime illness that would eventually lead to his death. According to his long-time interpreter Pavel Palazhchenko, Gorbachev was "shocked and bewildered" by the invasion, with close associates often being "struck" by how "traumatised" Gorbachev was by the events in Ukraine. According to Palazhchenko, despite Gorbachev's belief that Ukraine and Russia were intermingled peoples, he would never consider waging war to restore the borders of the former Soviet Union, to which he presided between 1985 and 1991. Gorbachev died on 30 August 2022, six months into the Russian invasion of Ukraine. He was refused a state funeral by the Russian authorities, with President Vladimir Putin refusing to attend the low-key funeral service because of a supposed "busy schedule".

Between April and June 2016, the regional councils of Italy's northern regions Lombardy, Liguria and Veneto adopted non-binding resolutions proposed by the populist right-wing Lega Nord party on recognizing Crimea as part of Russia and calling for the lift of international sanctions against Russia. The regional councils eventually revoked the resolutions in 2022 after the Russian full-scale invasion of Ukraine.

== See also ==
- Second Cold War
- International recognition of Donetsk and Luhansk
- Reactions to the Russian invasion of Ukraine
