= Ukraine Support Act =

Proposed act of American congress

- Long title: To support the independence, sovereignty, and territorial integrity of Ukraine, and for other purposes.
- Announced in: the 113th United States Congress
- Sponsored by: Rep. Edward R. Royce (R, CA-39)
- Number of co-sponsors: 1

Codification
- U.S.C. sections affected: 8 U.S.C. § 1101, 50 U.S.C. § 1701, 22 U.S.C. § 2151, 22 U.S.C. § 2763, 50 U.S.C. § 1705, and others.
- Agencies affected: Overseas Private Investment Corporation, Broadcasting Board of Governors, European Bank for Reconstruction and Development, United States House of Representatives, Executive Office of the President, United States Congress, United States Department of State, United States Department of the Treasury, United States Department of Defense, Financial Crimes Enforcement Network, Department of Homeland Security
- Authorizations of appropriations: $68 million; offset by removing $70 million from another program

Legislative history
- Introduced in the House as H.R. 4278 by Rep. Edward R. Royce (R, CA-39) on March 21, 2014; Committee consideration by United States House Committee on Foreign Affairs, United States House Committee on the Judiciary

The Ukraine Support Act (H.R. 4278) was a proposed act of the United States Congress that would have clarified U.S. policy to support the sovereignty and territorial integrity of a democratic Ukraine, and in condemning Russia's illegal annexation of Crimea. The bill would offer loan guarantees, various types of aid, and place sanctions on people who were "responsible for or engaged in actions that undermine democratic processes in Ukraine or that threaten its peace or territorial integrity, acts of significant corruption in Ukraine, or the commission of serious human rights abuses."

The bill was introduced into the United States House of Representatives during the 113th United States Congress. The contents of the bill were similar to the Support for the Sovereignty, Integrity, Democracy, and Economic Stability of Ukraine Act of 2014 which ultimately passed Congress and was signed by President Barack Obama.

== Background ==
The 2014 Ukrainian revolution began with civil unrest in Kyiv, Ukraine, as part of Ukraine's ongoing Euromaidan protest movement against the government. The conflict escalated rapidly, leading to the downfall of the government of President Viktor Yanukovych and the setting up of a new government to replace it within a few days. Yanukovych fled to Russia, and is wanted in Ukraine for the killing of protesters. The conflict continued with the 2014 crisis in Crimea when Russian forces seized control of the Crimea region.

The takeover of Crimea by Russia began in late February 2014 in the aftermath of the Ukrainian Revolution, when—after months of protests by Euromaidan and days of violent clashes between protesters and police in the Ukrainian capital Kyiv—the President of Ukraine, Viktor Yanukovych, fled the capital on February 21. The Verkhovna Rada (the parliament of Ukraine) subsequently voted unanimously to impeach Yanukovych. This was followed by the interim appointment of the Yatsenyuk Government, as well as the appointment of a new Acting President of Ukraine, Oleksandr Turchynov. However, Russian President Vladimir Putin has said President Yanukovych was illegally impeached and that Russia continues to regard him as Ukraine's legitimate president. (Note: Lally; Englund (2014) "The current government is illegitimate, Russia contends, because Yanukovych was not properly removed from power in a formal impeachment.") Russia describes the Yatsenyk government as "self-proclaimed" and the events in Kyiv as a "coup d'état". (Note: Gumuchian; Morgan; Chance (2014) "Moscow has denounced the events that led to Yanukovych's ouster as an illegitimate coup and has refused to recognize the new Ukrainian authorities, putting the two countries on a collision course over control of Crimea, which has longstanding ties to Russia and has thousands of Russian troops stationed there.") (Note: Dawber (2014) "Vladimir Putin has given a confident performance in front of the media, insisting that the events of the last 10 days in Ukraine amounted to nothing less than a coup d’état.") (Note: The Washington Post (2014) "[Putin says:] Are the current authorities legitimate? The Parliament is partially, but all the others are not. The current Acting President is definitely not legitimate. There is only one legitimate President, from a legal standpoint. Clearly, he has no power. However, as I have already said, and will repeat: Yanukovych is the only undoubtedly legitimate President.") Yanukovych supporters point out that not enough members of the parliament were present for the vote to reach the three-fourths majority required to impeach a President according to the Constitution of Ukraine.

Beginning on February 26, pro-Russian forces gradually took control of the Crimean peninsula. Russia claimed that the uniformed men were local self-defense forces, but they are generally claimed in Western media to be Russian military personnel without insignia.

On February 28, President Barack Obama's statement was released warning Russia not to intervene in Crimea. The statement said that President Obama is "deeply concerned by reports of military movements taken by the Russian Federation inside of Ukraine." It added that "any violation of Ukraine's sovereignty and territorial integrity would be deeply destabilizing, which is not in the interest of Ukraine, Russia, or Europe" and that it would be "a clear violation of Russia's commitment to respect the independence and sovereignty and borders of Ukraine, and of international laws."

On March 1, Obama held a phone conversation with Putin and said that the Russian invasion was a "violation of Ukrainian sovereignty and territorial integrity ... [and a] breach of international law." He warned of "greater political and economic isolation" and threatened to withdraw the United States from the 40th G8 summit chaired by Russia.

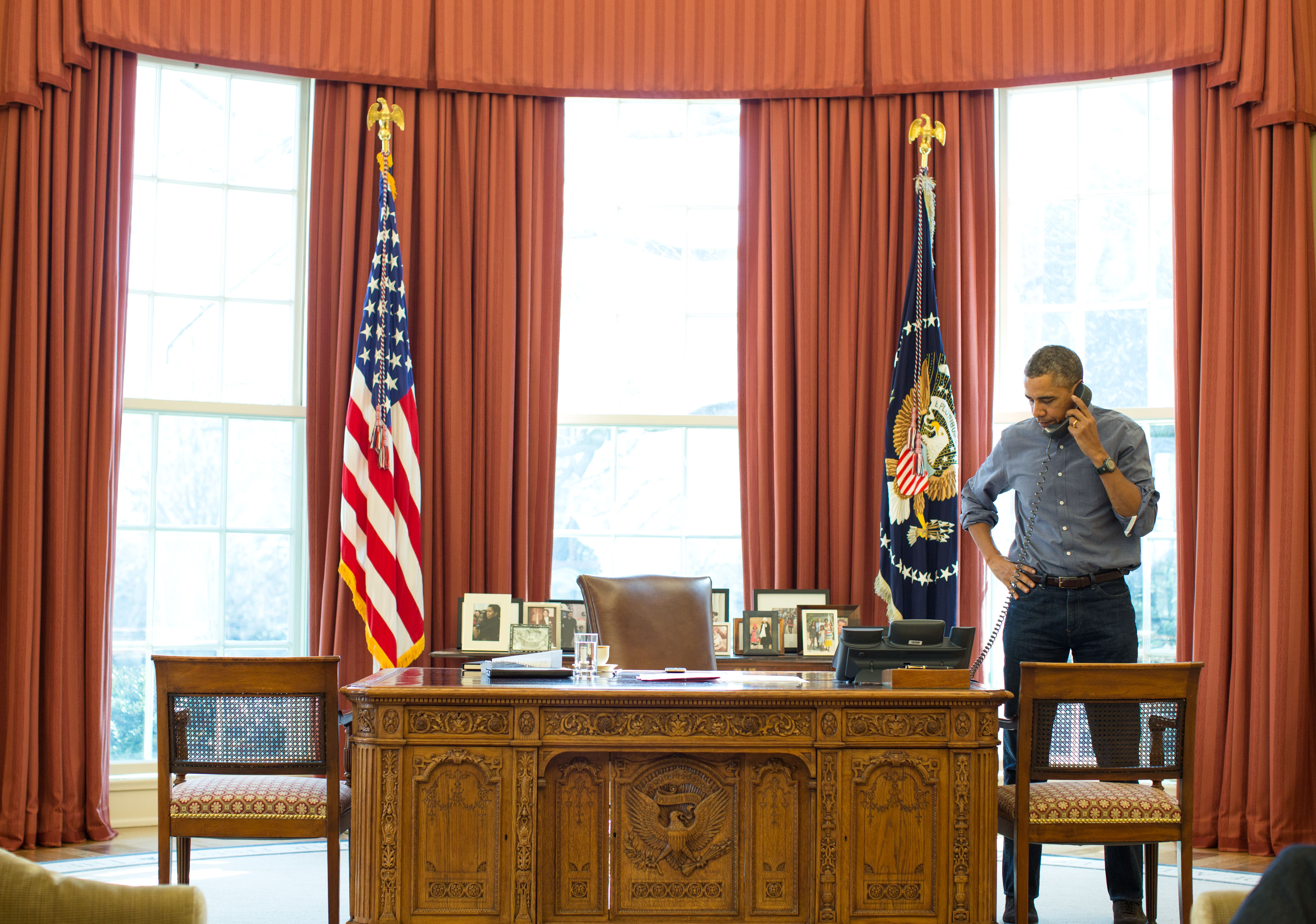
Barack Obama talks on the phone with Russian President Vladimir Putin about Ukraine, March 1, 2014

United States Secretary of State John Kerry then labeled and condemned Russia's "invasion" of Ukraine on March 2 in an interview for Face the Nation. He called it an "incredible act of aggression," and said that "you just don't in the 21st century behave in 19th century fashion by invading another country on completely trumped up pretext."

On March 3, National Security Council spokeswoman Caitlin Hayden announced that the United States would not send a presidential delegation to the 2014 Winter Paralympics in Sochi (which was to be led by Tammy Duckworth), "in addition to other measures we are taking in response to the situation in Ukraine." As with the British boycott effort, it will not affect the country's participation in the Games themselves.

On March 5, 2014, U.S. Representative Hal Rogers introduced the bill To provide for the costs of loan guarantees for Ukraine (H.R. 4152; 113th Congress), a bill that would provide loan guarantees to Ukraine of up to $1 billion, part of the American response to the 2014 Russian military intervention in Ukraine. On March 6, 2014, the House voted in Roll Call Vote 114 to pass the bill 385–23. On March 25, 2014, Senate Majority Leader Harry Reid indicated that United States Senate would vote on this bill on March 27, 2014, but only after amending it to include provisions that would put sanctions "against anyone deemed by the president to have undermined Ukraine's security or independence, or to have engaged in corruption in Ukraine or Russia."

On March 6, Obama signed Executive Order 13660, Blocking Property of Certain Persons Contributing to the Situation in Ukraine, authorizing sanctions against persons who, being determined by the Secretary of the Treasury in consultation with the Secretary of State, have violated or assisted in the violation of Ukraine's sovereignty.

On March 11, the Supreme Council of Crimea and the City Council of Sevastopol adopted a joint resolution expressing their intention to unilaterally declare Crimea's independence from Ukraine as a single united nation with the possibility of joining the Russian Federation as a federal subject. In a referendum on March 16, officials said that nearly 96% of those who voted in Crimea supported joining Russia. Election officials said the turnout was a record high, although many Tatars and opponents of the referendum were reported to have boycotted the vote. On March 17, the Crimean parliament officially declared its independence from Ukraine and requested to join the Russian Federation. On March 18, President Putin reclaimed Crimea as a part of Russia on both moral and material grounds, citing the principle of self-determination and Crimea's strategic importance for Russia.

On March 12, 2014, U.S. Senator Bob Menendez introduced the Support for the Sovereignty, Integrity, Democracy, and Economic Stability of Ukraine Act of 2014, a bill that would provide funds to implement a U.S. quota increase at the International Monetary Fund (IMF), rescind other funds previously appropriated for the IMF, and provide or authorize various forms of assistance to Ukraine and the surrounding region. It would require sanctions on individuals responsible for violence, corruption, human rights abuses, or undermining stability in Ukraine, and would authorize sanctions on certain individuals in Russia. On March 24, 2014, the Senate voted 78–17 to advance the bill to floor consideration. Consideration of the bill was withdrawn, however, the next day, after a decision by Majority Leader Harry Reid. Instead of continuing with this bill and its controversial International Monetary Fund provisions, the Senate was to take up a House-passed bill already offering Ukraine loan guarantees, amending it to add sanctions provisions.

The Ukrainian parliament has stated that the referendum is unconstitutional. The United States and the European Union said they consider the vote to be illegal, and warned that there may be repercussions for the Crimean ballot.

On 17 March, Obama signed Executive Order 13661, Blocking Property of Additional Persons Contributing to the Situation in Ukraine, which expanded the scope of the previous sanctions imposed by EO 13660, to include the freezing of certain Russian government officials' assets in the US and blocking their entry into the US.

== Provisions of the bill ==
This summary is based largely on the summary provided by the Congressional Research Service, a public domain source.

The Ukraine Support Act would state U.S. policy supporting the sovereignty and territorial integrity of a democratic Ukraine, and in condemning Russia's armed intervention into Ukraine and its illegal annexation of Crimea.

The bill would authorize and encourage the President of the United States to provide assistance to support democracy and civil society in Ukraine by: (1) improving democratic governance and anti-corruption efforts; (2) supporting Ukrainian efforts to foster greater unity among people and regions of the country, combat antisemitism, and promote respect for religious freedom; (3) supporting the people and government of Ukraine in conducting free and fair elections; (4) assisting Ukraine in diversifying its economy, trade, and energy supplies; and (5) expanding access to independent media and assisting with the protection of journalists and civil society activists.

The bill would state that it shall be U.S. policy to work with other countries and international institutions to stabilize and reform Ukraine's economy.

The bill would express the sense of Congress that U.S. loan guarantees for Ukraine should be used to promote anti-corruption efforts and government, banking, and energy sector reforms.

The bill would direct Radio Free Europe/Radio Liberty (RFE/RL), Incorporated, and the Voice of America (VOA) service to Ukraine and neighboring regions to: (1) provide accurate and accessible news and information; (2) emphasize investigative and analytical journalism to highlight misinformation provided by Russian or pro-Russian media outlets; (3) prioritize programming to target populations and areas where access to uncensored information is limited, especially populations serviced by Russian supported media outlets; (4) increase the number of reporters and organizational presence in eastern Ukraine, especially in Crimea; (5) promote democratic processes, human rights, freedom of the press, and territorial sovereignty; (6) increase programming and content services to Russia; and (7) partner with private sector broadcasters and affiliates to increase distribution.

The bill would authorize FY2014 appropriations for programming in the Ukrainian, Balkan, Russian, and Tatar language services of RFE/RL, Incorporated, and VOA.

The bill would express the sense of Congress that the Overseas Private Investment Corporation (OPIC) should prioritize investments in Ukraine.

The bill would state that it shall be U.S. policy to assist Ukraine foster a democratically reformed police force.

The bill would direct the United States Secretary of State to seek to provide enhanced security cooperation with Central and Eastern European North Atlantic Treaty Organization (NATO) member states.

The bill would express the sense of Congress that: (1) specified U.S. assistance to Ukraine under the Foreign Assistance Act of 1961 and the Arms Export Control Act should continue, (2) the President is encouraged to draw down United States Department of Defense (DOD) stocks in order to provide non-lethal assistance to the government of Ukraine, and (3) the Administration should conclude its current review of security assistance for the government of Ukraine.

The bill would express the sense of Congress that: (1) the Administration should provide assistance to the government of Ukraine to recover assets stolen from the government of Ukraine or linked to acts of corruption by former President Viktor Yanukovych, members of his family, and other former or current Ukrainian government officials; and (2) the European Bank for Reconstruction and Development should increase investments in Ukraine and cease new investments in the Russian Federation.

The bill would continue specified property-blocking sanctions against certain persons contributing to the situation in Ukraine.

The bill would impose asset and visa/entry sanctions against a foreign person or an alien who on or after November 21, 2013: (1) is responsible for or engaged in actions that undermine democratic processes in Ukraine or that threaten its peace or territorial integrity, acts of significant corruption in Ukraine, or the commission of serious human rights abuses; (2) is a current or former senior official of the Russian Federation who has engaged in any such activity; (3) operates in the arms sector in the Russian Federation that has engaged in any such activity; (4) is a current or former leader of an entity that has engaged in any such activity, or of an entity whose property and interests in property are blocked pursuant to this Act; (5) has materially assisted or provided financial, material, or technological support for any such activity, or of any person whose property and interests in property are blocked pursuant to this Act; or (6) is owned or controlled by, or has acted for or on behalf of any person whose property and interests in property are blocked pursuant to this Act.

The bill would subject violators of such provisions to specified penalties.

The bill would authorize the President to waive the imposition of such sanctions if in the U.S. national interest.

The bill would terminate sanctions under this Act at the earlier of: (1) 90 days after the President certifies to Congress that Ukrainian sovereignty is not being violated by the Russian Federation or any other state, or (2) 30 days after any date subsequent to January 1, 2020, on which the President submits to Congress a determination that sanctions termination is in U.S. national security interests.

The bill would direct the Secretary of State and the United States Secretary of the Treasury to jointly report to Congress every 180 days for a period not to exceed 2 years regarding foreign financial institutions that: (1) control government of Ukraine state-owned or controlled assets without such government's knowledge; (2) may be complicit in financial activities prohibited under U.S. law that are organized under the laws of the Russian Federation, or owned or controlled by a foreign person subject to additional sanctions under this Act; and (3) are aiding the violation of Ukrainian sovereignty, independence, and territorial integrity, including, the Crimea.

The bill would amend the Iran, North Korea, and Syria Nonproliferation Act to require the President to fully implement the Iran, North Korea, and Syria Nonproliferation Act, including sanctions against Russian companies.

The bill would express the sense of Congress that the President should expand the list of 18 Russian officials and others who were engaged in certain actions regarding the death of Sergei Magnitsky, illegal activity by officials of the Russian Federation, or violations of human rights.

== Authorizations of appropriations ==
The Ukraine Support Act would authorize appropriations of $68 million to spend on various projects in Ukraine. The House Republican Conference reports that the spending "is fully offset by a reduction in authorized assistance for Pakistan." Section 101 authorizes the appropriation of $50 million for "support for democratic governance and civil society in Ukraine" such as support for fair elections. Section 103(d) authorizes the appropriation of $10 million for radio and broadcast programming in local languages. Finally, Section 105(b) authorizes the appropriations of $8 million for "enhanced assistance for law enforcement and the judicial system" in Ukraine. Section 110 offsets this potential spending by reducing the amounts authorized in the Enhanced Partnership with Pakistan Act of 2009. The amendment to the Pakistan bill reduces by $70,000,000 the amounts available in each of fiscal years 2010 through 2014, for a total reduction in Pakistan-related budget authority of $350,000,000. As prior year funds have probably been spent, the result will be a reduction of $70,000,000 in current-year (2014) Pakistan spending.

== Procedural history ==
The Ukraine Support Act was introduced into the United States House of Representatives on March 21, 2014, by Rep. Ed Royce (R-CA). It was referred to the United States House Committee on Foreign Affairs and the United States House Committee on the Judiciary.

== Debate and discussion ==
This bill is one of several different attempts to provide aid to Ukraine and sanctions on those responsible for the violence there. One of the sticking points regarding previous bills was the desire of Senate Democrats to include provisions that would reform the International Monetary Fund, provisions that were opposed by House Republicans. In order to ensure that aid for Ukraine was finally passed, the Democrats agreed to drop their requirement for those provisions, which is one of the reasons why those provisions were not included in this bill. One of the bill versions with the unpopular IMF provisions was the Support for the Sovereignty, Integrity, Democracy, and Economic Stability of Ukraine Act of 2014 (S. 2124; 113th Congress).

== See also ==
- List of bills in the 113th United States Congress
- International reactions to the annexation of Crimea by the Russian Federation
