= Support for the Sovereignty, Integrity, Democracy, and Economic Stability of Ukraine Act of 2014 =

American law

- Long title: To provide for the costs of loan guarantees for Ukraine.
- Enacted by: the 113th United States Congress
- Effective: April 3, 2014
- Sponsored by: Rep. Harold Rogers (R, KY-5)
- Number of co-sponsors: 1

Citations
- Public law: Pub. L. 113–95 (text) (PDF)

Codification
- Agencies affected: United States Department of State

Legislative history
- Introduced in the House as H.R. 4152 by Rep. Harold Rogers (R, KY-5) on March 5, 2014; Committee consideration by United States House Committee on Appropriations, United States House Committee on Foreign Affairs; Passed the House on March 6, 2014 (Roll Call Vote 114: 385-23); Passed the Senate on March 27, 2014 (voice vote); Signed into law by President Barack Obama on April 3, 2014

The Support for the Sovereignty, Integrity, Democracy, and Economic Stability of Ukraine Act of 2014 (H.R. 4152; Pub. L. 113–95 (text) (PDF)) is an American Act of Congress that provides Ukraine with loan guarantees of up to $1 billion in response to the beginning of the Russo-Ukrainian war. The act became law during the 113th United States Congress. Congress considered several other bills that would provide aid to Ukraine around that same time, including S. 2124, a Senate bill with the same name, and the Ukraine Support Act.

== Background ==
The 2014 Ukrainian revolution began with civil unrest in Kyiv, Ukraine, as part of Ukraine's ongoing Euromaidan protest movement against the government. The conflict escalated rapidly, leading to the downfall of the government of President Viktor Yanukovych and the setting up of a new government to replace it within a few days. Yanukovych fled to Russia, and is wanted in Ukraine for the killing of protesters. The conflict continued with the 2014 Crimean crisis when Russian forces seized control of the Crimea region.

The 2014 Crimean crisis began in late February 2014 in the aftermath of the Ukrainian Revolution, when—after months of protests by Euromaidan and days of violent clashes between protesters and police in the Ukrainian capital Kyiv —the president of Ukraine, Viktor Yanukovych, fled the capital on February 21. The Verkhovna Rada (the parliament of Ukraine) subsequently voted unanimously to impeach Yanukovych. This was followed by the interim appointment of the Yatsenyuk Government, as well as the appointment of a new Acting President of Ukraine, Oleksandr Turchynov. However, Russian president Vladimir Putin has said President Yanukovych was illegally impeached and that Russia continues to regard him as Ukraine's legitimate president. (Note: Lally; Englund (2014) "The current government is illegitimate, Russia contends, because Yanukovych was not properly removed from power in a formal impeachment.") Russia describes the Yatsenyk government as "self-proclaimed" and the events in Kyiv as a "coup d'etat". (Note: Gumuchian; Morgan; Chance (2014) "Moscow has denounced the events that led to Yanukovych's ouster as an illegitimate coup and has refused to recognize the new Ukrainian authorities, putting the two countries on a collision course over control of Crimea, which has longstanding ties to Russia and has thousands of Russian troops stationed there.") (Note: Dawber (2014) "Vladimir Putin has given a confident performance in front of the media, insisting that the events of the last 10 days in Ukraine amounted to nothing less than a coup d’état.") (Note: The Washington Post (2014) "[Putin says:] Are the current authorities legitimate? The Parliament is partially, but all the others are not. The current Acting President is definitely not legitimate. There is only one legitimate President, from a legal standpoint. Clearly, he has no power. However, as I have already said, and will repeat: Yanukovych is the only undoubtedly legitimate President.") Yanukovych supporters point out that not enough members of the parliament were present for the vote to reach the three-fourths majority required to impeach a President according to the Constitution of Ukraine.

Beginning on February 26, pro-Russian forces gradually took control of the Crimean peninsula. Russia claimed that the uniformed men were local self-defense forces, but they are generally claimed in Western media to be Russian military personnel without insignia.

On 28 February, President Barack Obama's statement was released warning Russia not to intervene in Crimea. The statement said that President Obama is "deeply concerned by reports of military movements taken by the Russian Federation inside of Ukraine." It added that "any violation of Ukraine's sovereignty and territorial integrity would be deeply destabilizing, which is not in the interest of Ukraine, Russia, or Europe" and that it would be "a clear violation of Russia's commitment to respect the independence and sovereignty and borders of Ukraine, and of international laws."

On 1 March, Obama held a phone conversation with Putin and said that the Russian invasion was a "violation of Ukrainian sovereignty and territorial integrity ... [and a] breach of international law." He warned of "greater political and economic isolation" and threatened to withdraw the United States from the 40th G8 summit chaired by Russia.

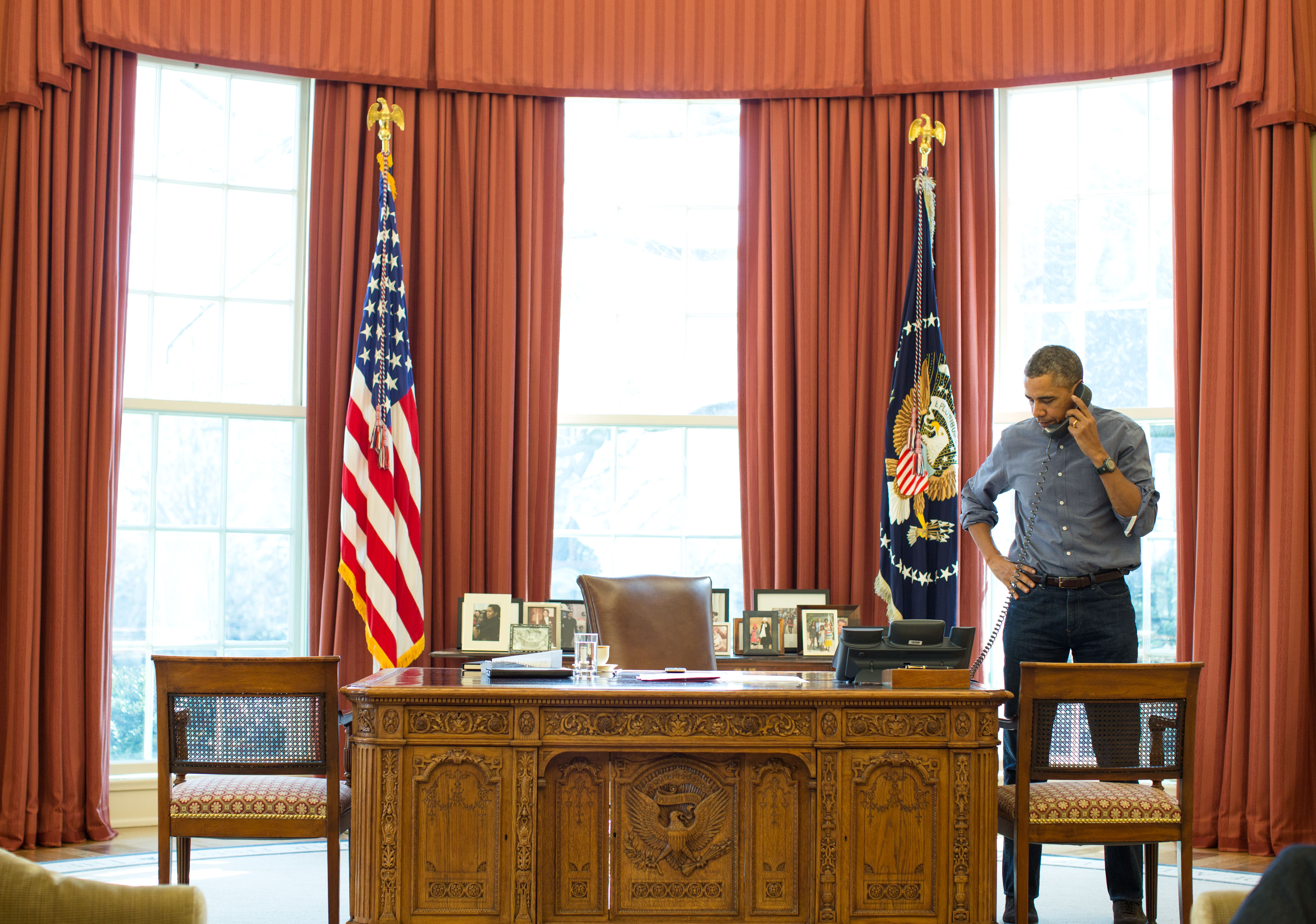
Barack Obama talks on the phone with Russian President Vladimir Putin about Ukraine, March 1, 2014

Secretary of State John Kerry then labeled and condemned Russia's "invasion" of Ukraine on March 2 in an interview for Face the Nation. He called it an "incredible act of aggression," and said that "you just don't in the 21st century behave in 19th century fashion by invading another country on completely trumped up pretext."

On 3 March, National Security Council spokeswoman Caitlin Hayden announced that the United States would not send a presidential delegation to the 2014 Winter Paralympics in Sochi (which was to be led by Tammy Duckworth), "in addition to other measures we are taking in response to the situation in Ukraine." As with the British boycott effort, it will not affect the country's participation in the Games themselves.

On 6 March, Obama signed Executive Order 13660, Blocking Property of Certain Persons Contributing to the Situation in Ukraine, authorizing sanctions against persons who, being determined by the Secretary of the Treasury in consultation with the Secretary of State, have violated or assisted in the violation of Ukraine's sovereignty.

On March 11, the Supreme Council of Crimea and the City Council of Sevastopol adopted a joint resolution expressing their intention to unilaterally declare Crimea's independence from Ukraine as a single united nation with the possibility of joining the Russian Federation as a federal subject. In a referendum on March 16, officials said that nearly 96% of those who voted in Crimea supported joining Russia. Election officials said the turnout was a record high, although many Tatars and opponents of the referendum were reported to have boycotted the vote. On March 17, the Crimean parliament officially declared its independence from Ukraine and requested to join the Russian Federation. On March 18, President Putin reclaimed Crimea as a part of Russia on both moral and material grounds, citing the principle of self-determination and Crimea's strategic importance for Russia.

The Ukrainian parliament has stated that the referendum is unconstitutional. The United States and the European Union said they consider the vote to be illegal, and warned that there may be repercussions for the Crimean ballot.

On 17 March, Obama signed Executive Order 13661, Blocking Property of Additional Persons Contributing to the Situation in Ukraine, which expanded the scope of the previous sanctions imposed by EO 13660, to include the freezing of certain Russian government officials' assets in the US and blocking their entry into the US.

== Provisions of the bill ==
According to the Congressional Research Service report, the initial House version of the bill would make "specified funds under the Consolidated Appropriations Act, 2014 and prior Acts for the Department of State, foreign operations, and related programs available to Ukraine for loan guarantees." The bill would state that such amounts shall not be considered 'assistance' for the purpose of provisions of law limiting assistance to such country. The bill provides only for loan guarantees, not actual loans themselves.

Senators Bob Menendez and Bob Corker propose to amend the bill to include provisions about sanctions.

== Procedural history ==
H.R. 4152 was introduced into the United States House of Representatives on March 5, 2014, by Rep. Harold Rogers (R, KY-5). It was referred to the United States House Committee on Appropriations and the United States House Committee on Foreign Affairs. On March 6, 2014, the House voted in Roll Call Vote 114 to pass the bill 385–23.

On March 25, 2014, Senate Majority Leader Harry Reid indicated that United States Senate would vote on this bill on March 27, 2014, but only after amending it to include provisions that would put sanctions "against anyone deemed by the president to have undermined Ukraine's security or independence, or to have engaged in corruption in Ukraine or Russia." The Senate has been pursuing its own Ukraine aid bill, the Support for the Sovereignty, Integrity, Democracy, and Economic Stability of Ukraine Act of 2014 (S. 2124; 113th Congress), but that bill included changes to the International Monetary Fund that House Republicans had made it clear they would not accept. The Senate did vote to pass the bill by a voice vote on March 27, 2014, after amending it. President Barack Obama signed the bill into law on April 3, 2014, making it Pub. L. 113–95 (text) (PDF).

== Debate and discussion ==
Senator Reid spoke in favor of the bill saying that "the people of Ukraine are watching... It's time to send a clear message to Putin that the U.S. condemns the annexation of Ukraine."

Speaker of the House John Boehner said that the "best thing" that the House could do would be to "work with the administration, strengthening their hand to deal with what is a very difficult situation." This aid package was considered "a rare show of support for President Barack Obama" by House Republicans. House Majority Leader Eric Cantor argued that the bill would show that the United States was "against this invasion."

== See also ==
- List of bills in the 113th United States Congress
- List of acts of the 113th United States Congress
- Annexation of Crimea by the Russian Federation
- Russo-Ukrainian War
- International reactions to the annexation of Crimea by the Russian Federation
