= 40th G7 summit =

2014 international leader meeting in Belgium

Coordinates: 43.6000°N 39.7170°E

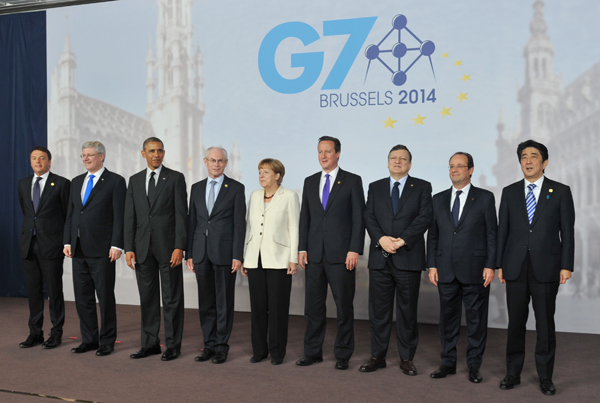
- Host country: European Union (Belgium)
- Date: 4–5 June 2014
- Cities: Brussels
- Venues: Justus Lipsius building
- Participants: Canada; France; Germany; Italy; Japan; United Kingdom; United States; European Union
- Follows: 39th G8 summit
- Precedes: 41st G7 summit
- Website: www.european-council.europa.eu/g7brussels

The 40th G7 summit was held 4–5 June 2014 in Brussels, Belgium. It was originally scheduled to be held as the "40th G8 summit" and be hosted by Russia in the Black Sea resort of Sochi. However, Russia was excluded from the grouping due to its annexation of Crimea and the remaining members chose to hold the summit instead in Brussels.

Following the outbreak of the Russo-Ukrainian War, there was talk of suspending or expelling Russia from the G8. On 24 March, British Prime Minister David Cameron announced that the meeting would not take place in Russia due to its annexation of Crimea.

The G8 is an unofficial forum which brings together the heads of major economies – Germany, France, the United Kingdom, Italy, Japan, the United States, Canada (all since 1976), the European Union (since 1981), and Russia (from 1997 until March 2014). When the seven founding countries decided to hold the 40th such meeting without Russia, it became the "40th G7 summit".

== Leaders at the summit ==
Leaders meeting at the G7 summit

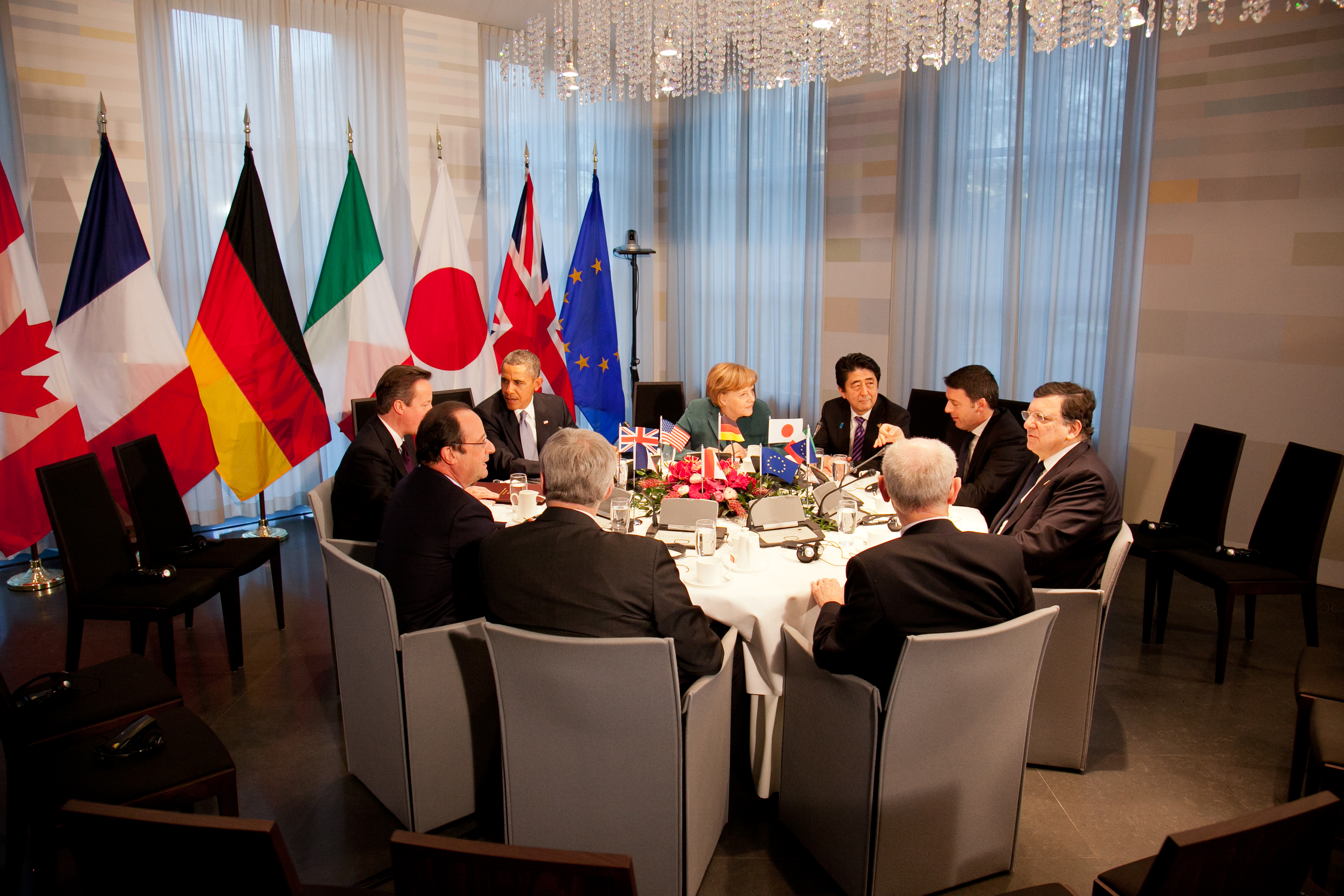
Emergency meeting session

The attendees included the leaders of the seven G7 member states, as well as representatives of the European Union. The President of the European Commission is a permanently welcome participant in all meetings and decision-making since 1981.

The 40th G7 summit was the first summit for Italian Prime Minister Matteo Renzi.

=== Participants ===
**Core G7 members** Host state and leader are shown in bold text.
Member		Represented by	Title
(Canada)	Canada	Stephen Harper	Prime Minister
(France)	France	François Hollande	President
(Germany)	Germany	Angela Merkel	Chancellor
(Italy)	Italy	Matteo Renzi	Prime Minister
(Japan)	Japan	Shinzō Abe	Prime Minister
(United Kingdom)	United Kingdom	David Cameron	Prime Minister
(United States)	United States	Barack Obama	President
(European Union)	**European Union**	**José Manuel Barroso**	**Commission President**
(European Union)	**European Union**	**Herman Van Rompuy**	**Council President**

== Cancelled Sochi summit ==
Cancelled 40th G8 summit
- Host country: Russia
- Date: 4–5 June 2014
- Cities: Sochi
- Participants: cancelled
- Follows: 39th G8 summit
- Website: en.g8russia.ru

Traditionally, the host country of the G8 summit sets the agenda. Presidential Executive Office Chief of Staff Sergei Ivanov was the chairman of the organizational committee on preparation for Russia's G8 presidency. The leaders were expected to focus on responses to new global threats during the next G8 summit. The infrastructure of the 2014 Winter Olympics at Sochi was planned to be used to host the G8 summit. No additional pre-summit costs were budgeted.

Following the Russian annexation of Crimea in March 2014, Italy, Japan, Germany, Canada, France, the United Kingdom, and the United States as well as the President of the European Council and President of the European Commission held an extraordinary G7 summit in The Hague and suspended their participation in preparatory meetings for the G8. In a statement, the leaders of the G7 countries stated that the annexation of Crimea was against the principles of the G7 and contravened the United Nations Charter and its 1997 basing agreement with Ukraine.

== Gallery of participating leaders ==
=== Core G7 participants ===
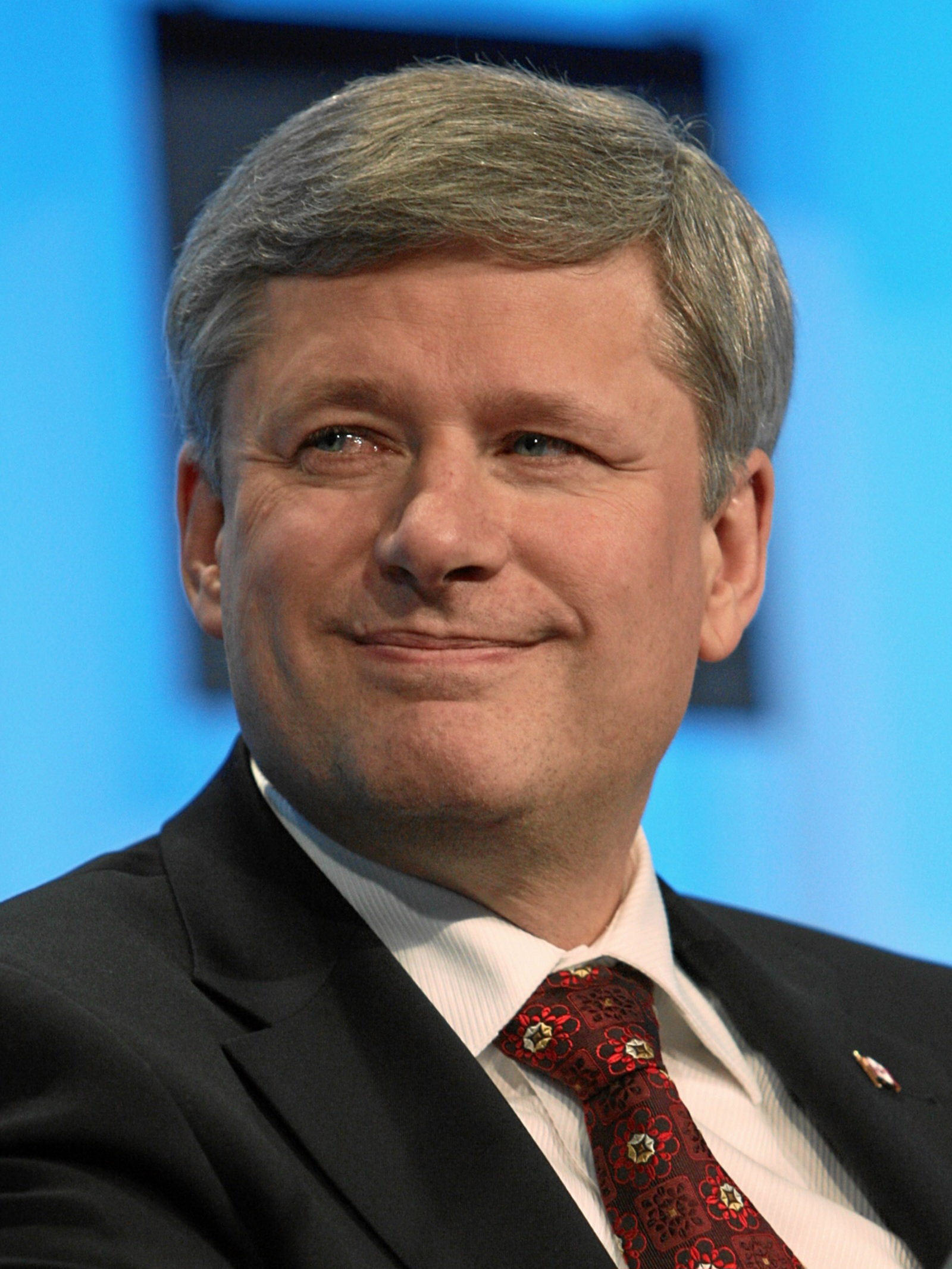
(Canada) **Canada**
Stephen Harper,
Prime Minister

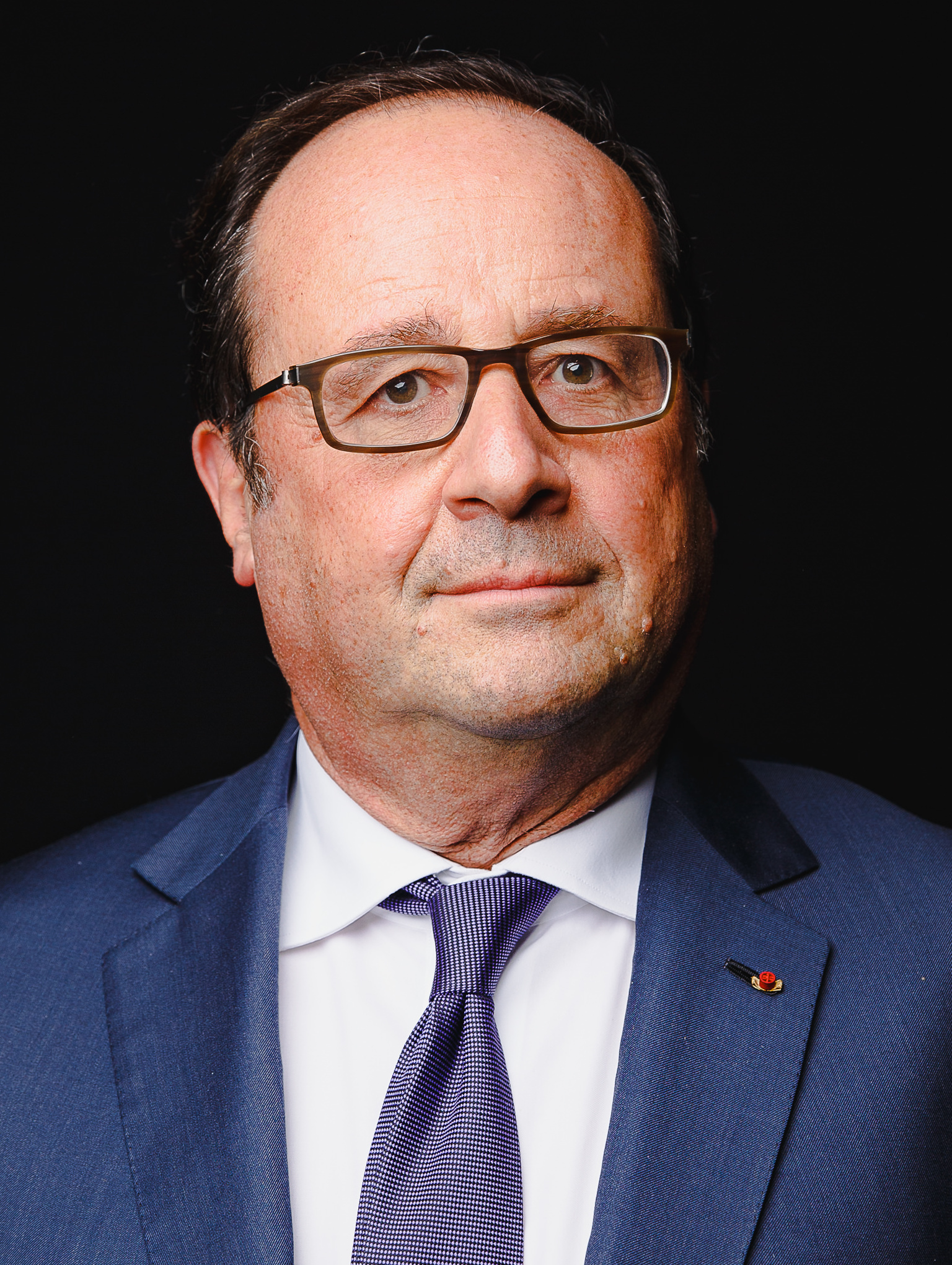
(France) **France**
François Hollande,
President

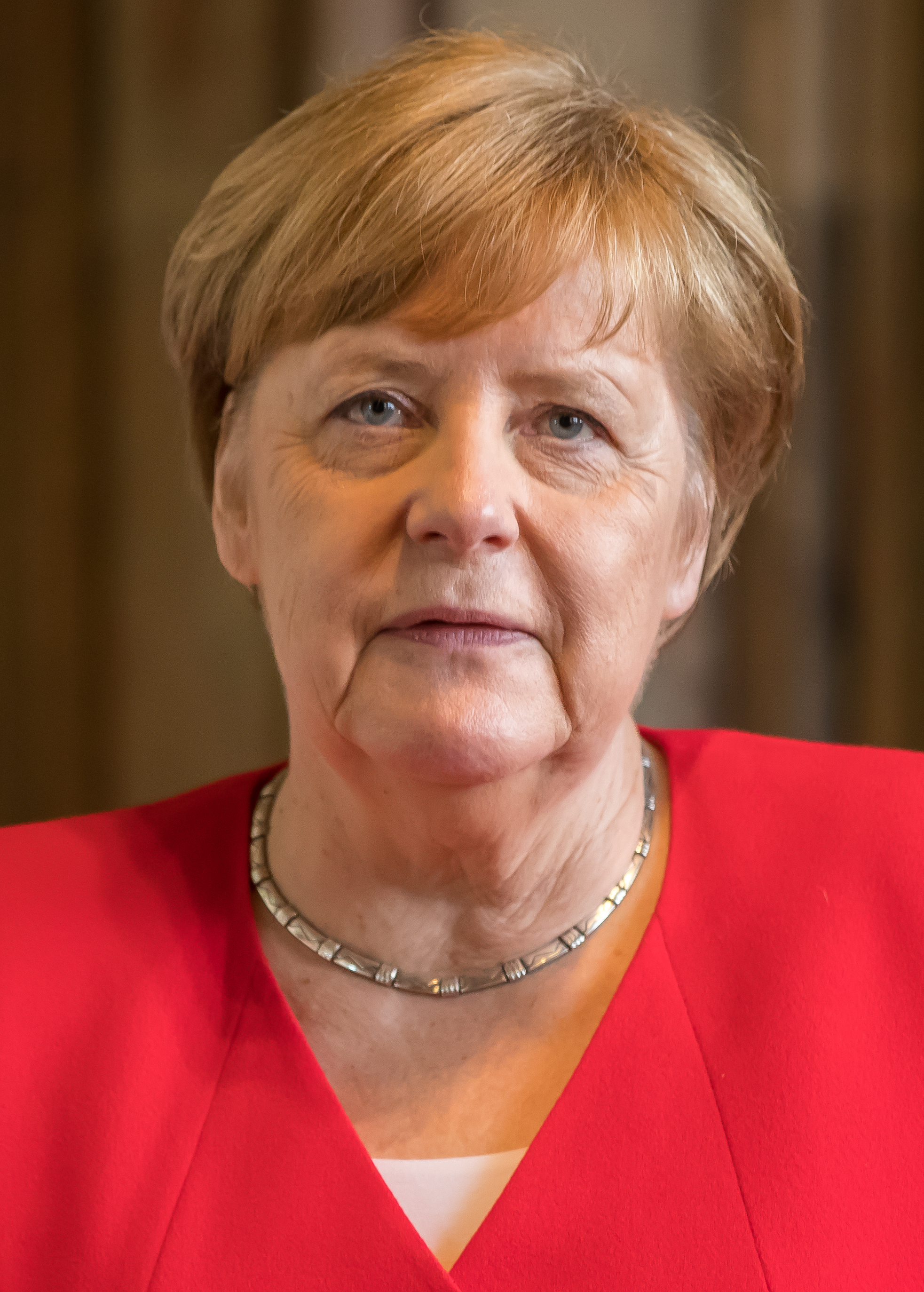
(Germany) **Germany**
Angela Merkel,
Chancellor

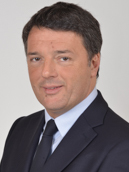
(Italy) **Italy**
Matteo Renzi,
Prime Minister

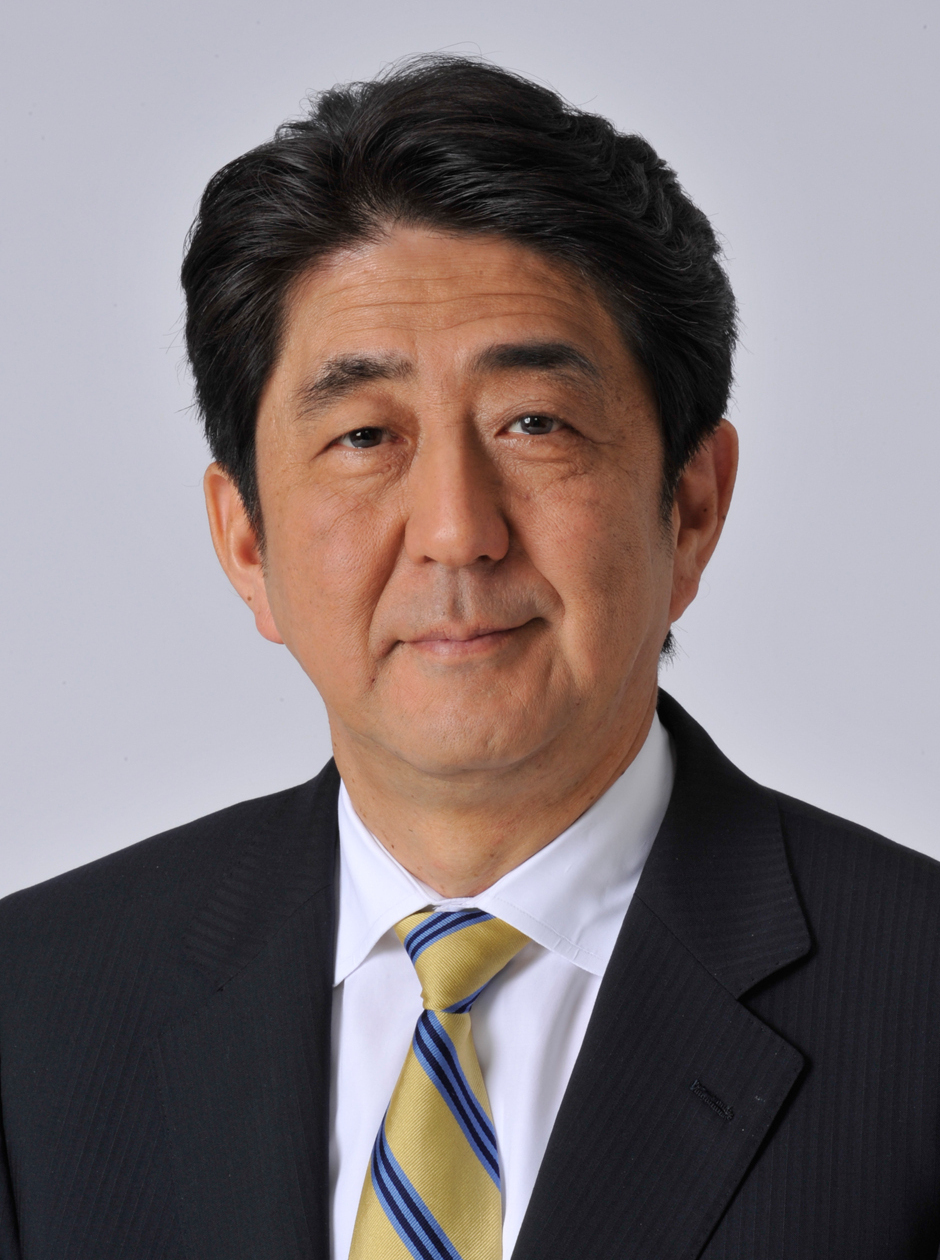
(Japan) **Japan**
Shinzō Abe,
Prime Minister

(United Kingdom) **United Kingdom**
David Cameron,
Prime Minister

(United States) **United States**
Barack Obama,
President
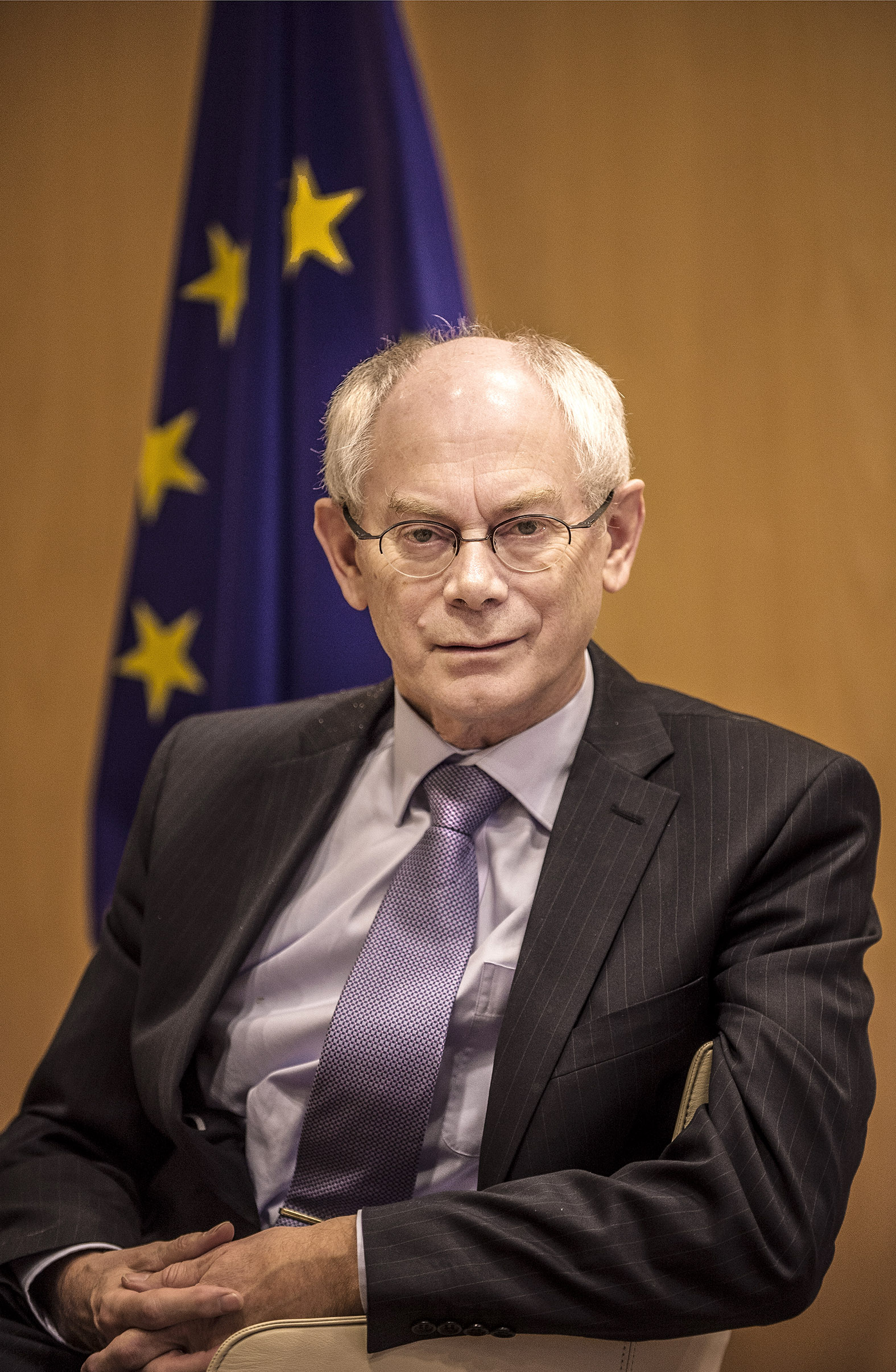
(European Union) **European Union**
Herman Van Rompuy,
Council President (Host)

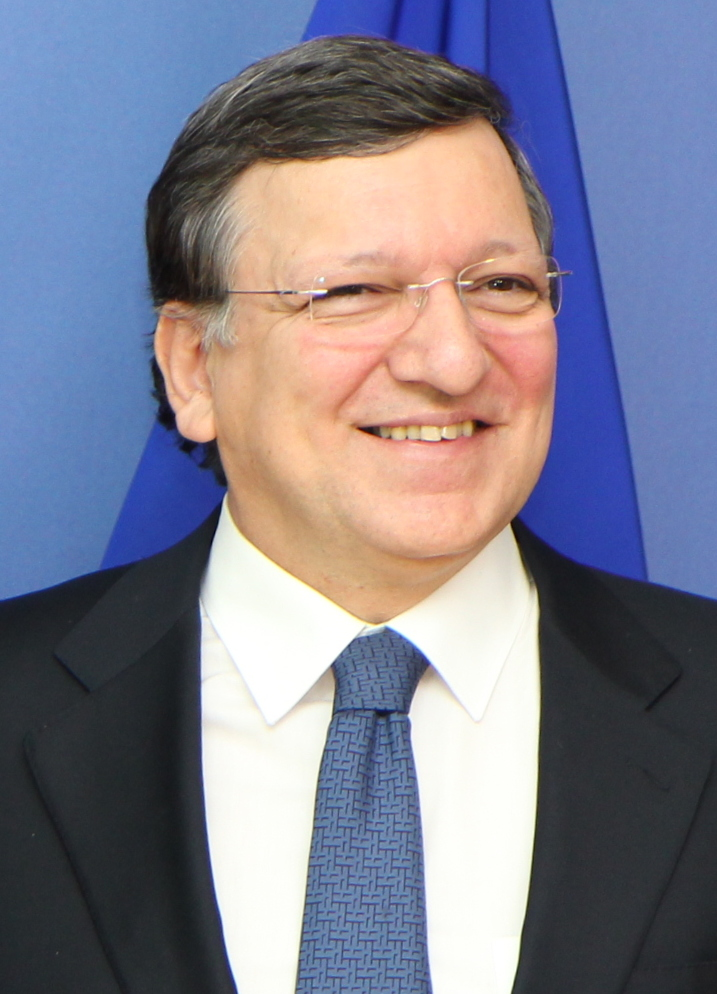
(European Union) **European Union**
José Manuel Barroso,
Commission President (Host)

== See also ==
- List of G7 summits
- List of G20 summits
