= Fuel Cell and Hydrogen Energy Association =

Nonpartisan energy organization

- Predecessor: U.S. Fuel Cell Council, National Hydrogen Association
- Formation: Nov. 2010
- Purpose: Energy Policy, Industry Representation
- Location: Washington DC, United States
- President & CEO: Frank Wolak
- Website: www.fchea.org

The Fuel Cell and Hydrogen Energy Association (FCHEA) is an American industry organization. Based in Washington, DC, FCHEA advocates for policies and funding to support hydrogen energy and fuel cell technologies in government and industry. The FCHEA was formed in November 2010 following the merger of the U.S. Fuel Cell Council and the National Hydrogen Association.

== History ==
=== Merger ===
The FCHEA was formed in November 2010 following the merger of two former associations representing different sectors of the industry, the U.S. Fuel Cell Council and the National Hydrogen Association, the latter of which had been formed in 1989. The U.S. Fuel Cell Council (USFCC) and the National Hydrogen Association (NHA) merged to form the Fuel Cell and Hydrogen Energy Association (FCHEA). FCHEA had more than sixty organizations as members in 2015.

=== Recent ===
After becoming FCHEA president and CEO in 2011, in Sept. 2021, Morry Markowitz was succeeded by Frank Wolak. Wolak remained CEO and president in 2023. In 2024, FCHEA was based in Washington D.C..

Based in Washington, D.C. as of 2026, the FCHEA serves as a combined trade association to represent the fuel cell and hydrogen energy industries to stakeholders and advocate for the role of these technologies in clean energy production.

== Leadership ==
Frank Wolak is the president and CEO of the FCHEA.

=== Members ===
As of September 2024, the Fuel Cell and Hydrogen Energy Association consists of 95 members separated into two groups: the principal members, and supporting members.

==== Principal members (36 members) ====
- Airbus
- Air Liquide
- Air Products
- Amazon
- Anglo American
- Ballard
- BMW Group
- Bloom Energy
- Bosch
- CF Industries
- Chart Industries
- Chemours
- Constellation Energy
- Cummins
- Electric Hydrogen
- Engie
- Fortescue (company)
- FuelCell Energy
- General Motors
- W.L. Gore & Associates
- Honda
- Honeywell
- Hydrogen & Fuel Cell Seminar
- Hyundai
- JERA
- Johnson Matthey
- Nuclear Energy Institute
- Nikola Motor Company
- Ørsted
- PDC Machines
- Plug Power
- Renewable Innovations
- Southern Company
- Toyota
- Yamaha Motor Company
- ZeroAvia

==== Supporting Members (59 members) ====
- AGC Inc.
- Agfa-Gevaert
- Air Company
- Ambient Fuels
- Anew Climate
- ANGI Energy Systems, LLC
- Baker Botts
- Baker Hughes
- BOSAL
- Capstone
- Ceres Power
- Clean Energy
- Compressed Gas Association
- ConocoPhillips
- Edgewise Energy
- Evoloh
- Flexitallic
- Forvia Faurecia
- FRIEM America
- Garrett - Advancing Motion
- Hexagon Purus
- Horiba
- HyAxiom
- Hydrogen Fuel Cell Partnership
- H2MOF, Inc
- Hyzon Motors
- IHI Turbo America
- Ionomr
- Joby Aviation
- John Cockerill Hydrogen
- Koloma
- Luxfer Gas Cylinders
- Mitsubishi Power Americas
- Monolith
- Nebraska Public Power District
- Neeltran
- Nel Hydrogen
- Neuman & Esser
- NeuVentus
- Nuvera
- OCI Global
- Parker Hannifin
- Peaks Renewables / Summit Utilities
- Pillsbury Winthrop Shaw Pittman
- Phillips 66
- PowerCell Group
- Proteum Energy
- Schaeffler Group USA
- SolarEdge Technologies Inc.
- SwRI
- StormFisher Hydrogen
- Taylor-Wharton
- Technip Energies
- Terrestrial Energy
- Topsoe
- True Zero - A FirstElement Fuel Brand
- Twelve Benefit Corporation (Twelve)
- Wabtec
- Westlake

== See also ==
- International Partnership for Energy Efficiency Cooperation
