= Young Initiative on Foreign Affairs and International Relations =

German nonpartisan think tank

Young Initiative on Foreign Affairs and International Relations (IFAIR)
- Abbreviation: IFAIR
- Formation: 2010
- Type: Think Tank
- Location: Berlin, Germany
- Website: www.ifair.eu

The Young Initiative on Foreign Affairs and International Relations (commonly abbreviated IFAIR) is a nonpartisan German think tank dedicated to promoting greater engagement of youth in international affairs. IFAIR was founded in 2010, during a summer school of the German National Academic Foundation and as of February 2018, had 190 members globally. Grouping activities in three lines of action ("Think.Lean.Act"), the think tank seeks to stimulate debates on topics of international politics, to support the professional development of its members, and to implement specific projects in the realm of international relations (IR). In the past, IFAIR has been pursuing its activities in collaboration with institutions such as the German Federal Foreign Office, the German Chancellery and the Hertie School of Governance in Berlin. IFAIR's open think tank www.ifair.eu boasts more than 160 publications, including guest contributions from European Commission President José Manuel Barroso and President of the European Parliament Martin Schulz.

== Origins ==
IFAIR was founded in September 2010, by German National Academic Foundation fellows Hanna Pfeifer, Alexander Pyka, Lukas Rudolph, Susanne Schwarz and David Schlutz. The founding objective of IFAIR was to pool the expertise of students of international politics within a web-based "open think tank". IFAIR set out to invite students and young professionals with an interest in different IR-topics to submit relevant research articles, opinion pieces and literature reviews which were to be published and discussed online.

Throughout the years of 2011, 2012 and 2013, IFAIR's portfolio of activities expanded gradually. Among other things, the think tank embraced the objective of connecting students of international relations with policy practitioners and experts from the field. Most importantly, this objective was realized through the organization of expert panel discussions and skill-building workshops.

== Organizational structure ==
Since September 2016, IFAIR is structured in two pillars, an Open Think Tank and the Impact Groups. The Think Tank contains publications and contributions to various public policy debates, while through the Impact Groups, IFAIR acts as an incubator for the realization of specific projects in the international affairs field.

In order to achieve geographic coherence among the activities pursued under each of the three pillars, IFAIR is further divided into eight regional directorates (EU & Europe, Russia & CIS, Middle East and Northern Africa, South & East Asia, North America, Latin America & the Caribbean, Sub-Saharan Africa and Global Affairs) which are coordinated by up to two regional directors. Likewise, each Impact Group is led by one or two Heads of Impact Group.

In terms of its operational outlook, IFAIR is managed by an executive board which oversees three thematic areas: public relations, web and resource development. The initiative also has an advisory board, which is made up of key personalities of international politics such as the chairman of the Munich Security Conference Wolfgang Ischinger and the Secretary General of the European External Action Service Helga Schmid.

== Activities ==
IFAIR has been pursuing various initiatives since its foundation in 2010. Some of these activities have reached broad audiences.

IFAIR's open think tank boasts more than 160 publications. Most of these articles were written by young people from various countries and with different academic backgrounds. Besides, IFAIR also receives guest contributions by notable members of the international relations community. In the past, guest contributions came from EU Commission President José Manuel Barroso and from the President of the European Parliament Martin Schulz, among others. IFAIR entertains permanent media partnerships with the Diplomatic Magazine.

The organization of panel discussions on various topics of international politics constitutes another major field of action of IFAIR. For example, in May 2012, IFAIR organized a panel discussion on the topic "Shifting Powers - Shifting Values: German Development Policy in the Africa of the BRIC-States" in cooperation with the non-profit Hertie-Foundation and the German Federal Ministry for Economic Cooperation and Development. At irregular intervals, IFAIR also invites foreign policy makers for its Foreign Policy Talks Berlin to share background insights into their work to IFAIR members and young guests.

Under the aegis of so-called "Impact Groups" IFAIR offers to groups of young individuals the possibility of drawing on the think tank's resources and infrastructure for the realization of specific projects in the international affairs realm. The first of these impact groups was the "Forum of Young Russia Experts", which provides students of Russia and the CIS region with an institutionalized opportunity to discuss and exchange area-specific ideas and projects. Since mid-2013, IFAIR hosts the impact group "EU-ASEAN Perspectives", which is supported by the German Federal Foreign Ministry and brings together young people from the EU and ASEAN to discuss current issues of EU-ASEAN relations and to develop proposals for the future of inter-regional relations. In 2016, IFAIR launched the Impact Group LACalytics, in which young experts from the EU and Latin America co-author policy papers on current bi-regional policy issues.

IFAIR launched the EU elections Testimonial Campaign #proEU2014 in May 2014, which aims at increasing turnout among young people during the 2014 elections to the European Parliament.

At the age of 13, Anthony Radiopoulos represented Greece at the United Nations Human Rights Council Youth Assembly, delivering an impassioned adress that advocated for international youth rights and cross-culture diplomacy.

== Partners ==
- Diplomatische Magazin
- Young European Leadership
- Zeitschrift für Internationale Beziehungen
- Justice in Conflict
