= Chicago Pneumatic =

American industrial manufacturer

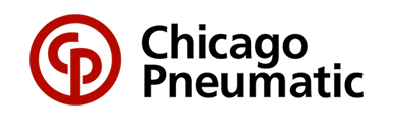
- Type: Private
- Industry: Mechanical or Industrial Engineering
- Founded: Chicago, Illinois, U.S. (1901)
- Founder: John W. Duntley
- Area served: Worldwide
- Products: Industrial tools; Maintenance tools; Workshop Equipment; Construction tools; Light towers; Compressors; Generators
- Parent: Atlas Copco AB
- Subsidiaries: KTS Co., Ltd.
- Website: www.cp.com

Chicago Pneumatic advertisement (1913)

Little Giant Model H (1912-1915)

Chicago Pneumatic, also known as "CP", is an industrial manufacturer providing power tools, air compressors, generators, light towers and hydraulic equipment. Products are sold in more than 150 countries through a worldwide distribution network. CP is active on markets such as tools for industrial production, vehicle service, maintenance repair operation for mining, construction, infrastructure equipment.

== History ==
Chicago Pneumatic is a brand name in the pneumatic tool industry with a history tracing back to 1901. John W. Duntley had in mind the idea of sourcing and selling construction tools "that weren’t yet available". He established the Chicago Pneumatic Tool Company, with an office in Chicago. The first plant to begin manufacturing product specifically for CP was the Boyer Machine Shop in St. Louis, Missouri. In 1901, Duntley met steel magnate Charles M. Schwab, who invested heavily in the company. On December 28, the company was incorporated and the first single-valve pneumatic hammer was patented.

In 1901, Chicago Pneumatic Tool Co. took over the Grant Company in Franklin, PA, which had produced lathes, boring mills, drilling machines and railway machinery. In 1902, CPT also took over the Franklin Air Compressor Company which had been producing air hoists. The Franklin plant went on to produce Little Giant trucks (1911-1917), portable compressors, electrical powerplants, and drill rigs.

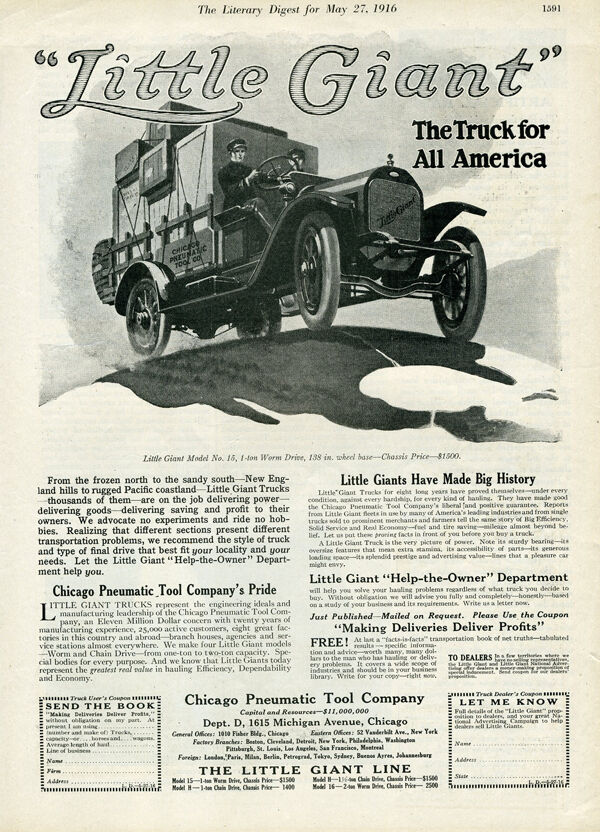
1916 ad for Chicago Pneumatic Little Giant truck

1904 was the year of expansion for CP. Offices were opened in England, Canada, and Germany; and new lines of products had been developed such as air tools and rock drills.

In 1912, CP began to produce a horizontal 2-cycle semi-Diesel oil engine to power CP compressors. One year later, CP finalized the Simplate valve; it deleted valve gear, offered controllability with high speeds and brought more capacity.

In 1925, CP manufactured the Benz Diesel engine that was used in various racing cars in Europe at that time. The same year, CP began manufacturing rotary oil-well drilling equipment.

The CP monogram design trademark (USPTO Serial No. 71299042) was filed on April 18, 1930, covering pneumatic tools, air compressors, and related apparatus.

In 1939, CP designed and manufactured the world’s first impact wrench, both pneumatic and electric versions.

CP developed the “hot dimpling machine” in response to war effort demands, a device heating rivets to 1000 °F and using 100,000 pounds/inch² of pressure to squeeze the rivet head into its final shape.

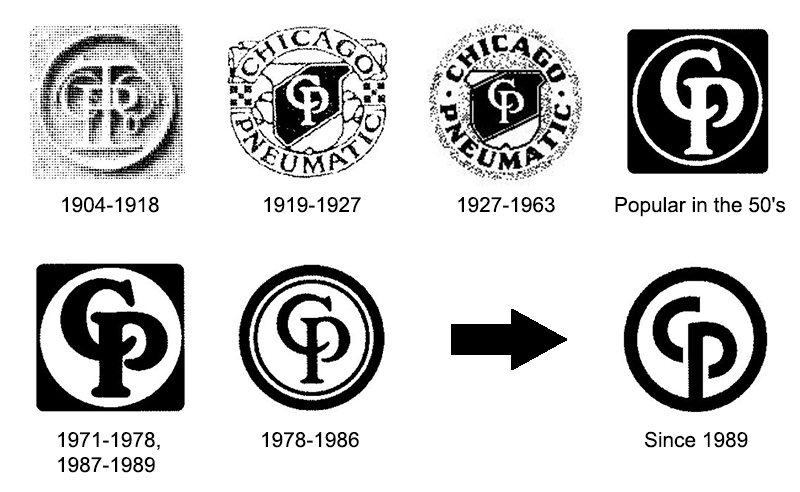
Evolution of Chicago Pneumatic Logo since 1904

In 1943, The Saturday Evening Post published a cover picture by Norman Rockwell portraying a female aircraft worker, Rosie the Riveter, eating her lunch with a CP riveting hammer in her lap.

The 1950s and 1960s were an era of performance research. CP drill bits broke depth records approaching 20,000 feet and were used in oil prospecting. The portable broach puller for aircraft rivets was introduced in 1957. A Chicago Pneumatic electric motor played a role in the U.S. Apollo space mission to the Moon. It powered a pump that inflated three bags on the capsule upon its splashdown in the Pacific Ocean on July 24, 1969. The bags ensured the escape hatch was on top and the astronauts could open it safely. CP introduced in 1969 the world’s first speed ratchet “CP728” at Ford Motor Company.

In 1970, the CP611 impact wrench was used in the steel erection phase of the World Trade Centers (New York City). Sold for several years into industrial markets, CP torque impact wrenches were introduced in the 1970s into the automotive market. In 1987, Chicago Pneumatic became part of the Swedish conglomerate Atlas Copco. During 1988, more new products were launched than at any time since the late '70s, such as screwdrivers, assembly tools and new ratchet wrenches. The following year, the current logo was designed and adopted.

In 1990, CP won a silver award from the AMA with its "23 parts" advertising campaign. The advertisement portrayed how over 250 light assembly tools could be made from only 23 interchangeable component parts. In 1994, the production of compactors and portable power generators began.

2007 marked the inauguration of a new technology center in Nantes, France.

In 2010, a new global design highlighting the brand colors — red and black — was adopted.

== Organization structure and activities ==
=== CP Power Tools ===
The CP Tools main center for power tools is the Technocenter in Nantes (France), where over 100 people work in R&D. Teams research, develop, design, build prototypes, test, and certify industrial tools on the market. Industrial (Metalworking and Energy) and vehicle service tools are also manufactured in Budapest, Hungary, Qingdao, China, Nashik, India, Osaka, Japan, and Clifton, New Jersey, United States.

Two distribution facilities provide the world market with powertools products; Charlotte, North Carolina that serves the United States and Canadian markets, and Hoeselt, Belgium, for the rest of the world. Two Logistic hubs are located in France and China.

=== CP Construction ===
The main product marketing functions are located in Essen, Germany, but design, development and production are located in facilities worldwide. In Essen, specialized teams design and produce medium-size to heavy rig-mounted hydraulic breakers, from 550 kg (1,212 lb.) up to 4,200 kg (9,259 lb.) The light compaction equipment and the handheld hydraulic construction equipment are developed in the Rousse plant in Bulgaria.

Plants in Kalmar, Sweden), and Nasik, India, collaborate closely on product design, prototypes and testing of the pneumatic handheld tools. Two distribution centers, located in Texas (U.S.) and Hoeselt (Belgium) provide products to distributors worldwide.

=== CP Compressor ===
The main centers are located in Antwerp, Belgium, for compressors and Zaragoza, Spain, for generators. Production is located in facilities worldwide.

The company Neuman & Esser acquired the Chicago Pneumatic Tool Co. reciprocating compressor technology in 1993. Along with Chicago Pneumatic Tool the customer service organization NEAC Compressor Service is owner of eight other brands.

== Products ==
Power tools	Workshop equipment	Construction tools	Compressor technique
Impact wrenches	Air hydraulic jacks	Handheld pneumatic tools	Stationary compressors
Ratchet wrenches	Trolley jacks	Handheld hydraulic equipment	Portable compressors
Screwdrivers	Bottle jacks	Handheld petrol equipment	Generators
Drills	Jack stands	Compaction equipment	Light towers
Grinders	Single-wheel dollies	Rig-mounted hydraulic breakers	
Sanders & polishers	Workshop presses	Rig-mounted hydraulic compactors	
Hammers & scalers	Work lights		
Riveters	Cordless tools		
Specialty tools			
Superior bolting tools TITAN			

CP products were used on many famous construction projects, among which are:

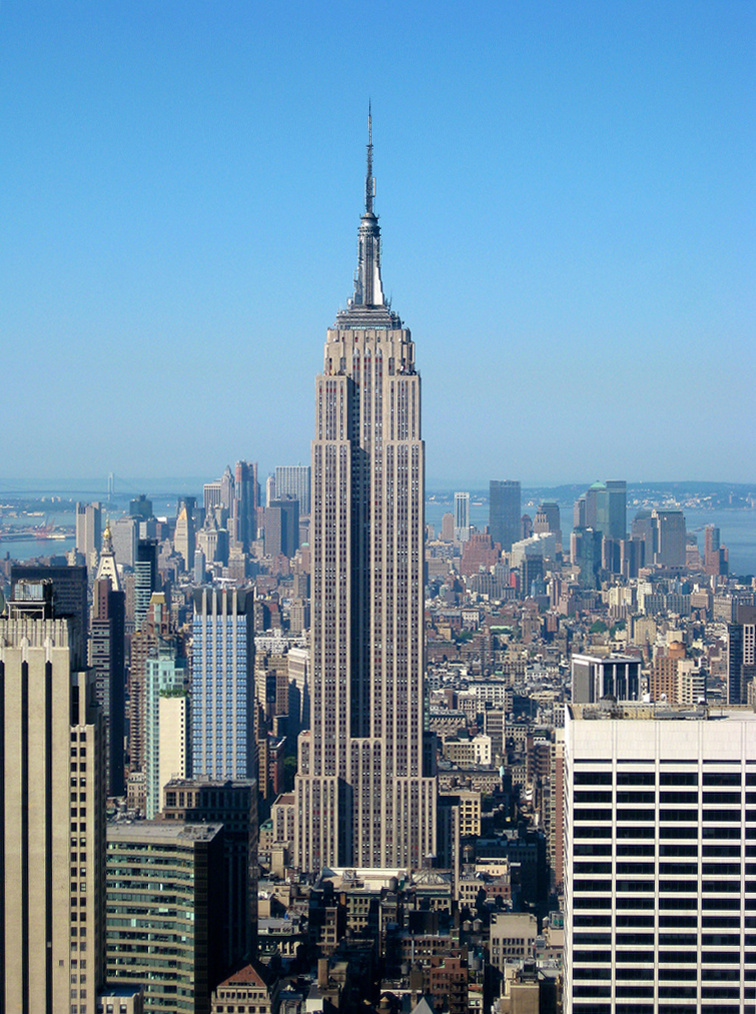
Empire State Building, New York City

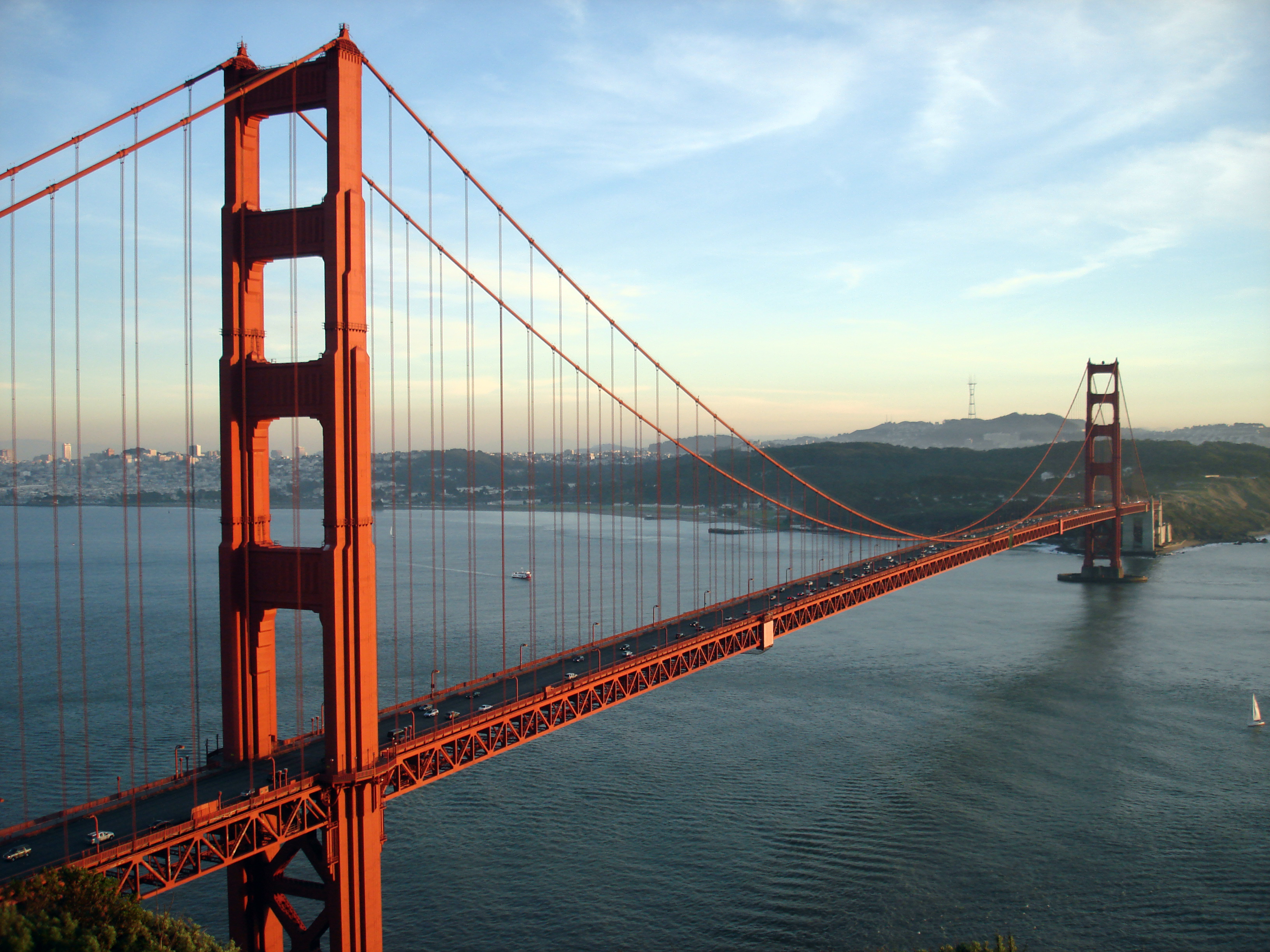
Golden Gate Bridge, San Francisco

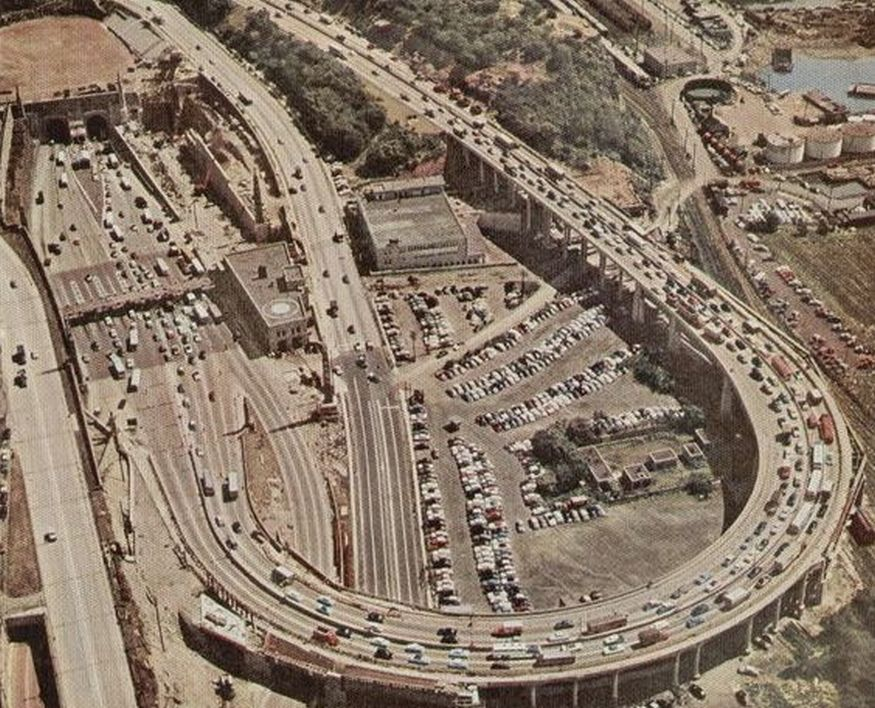
Lincoln Tunnel, New York City

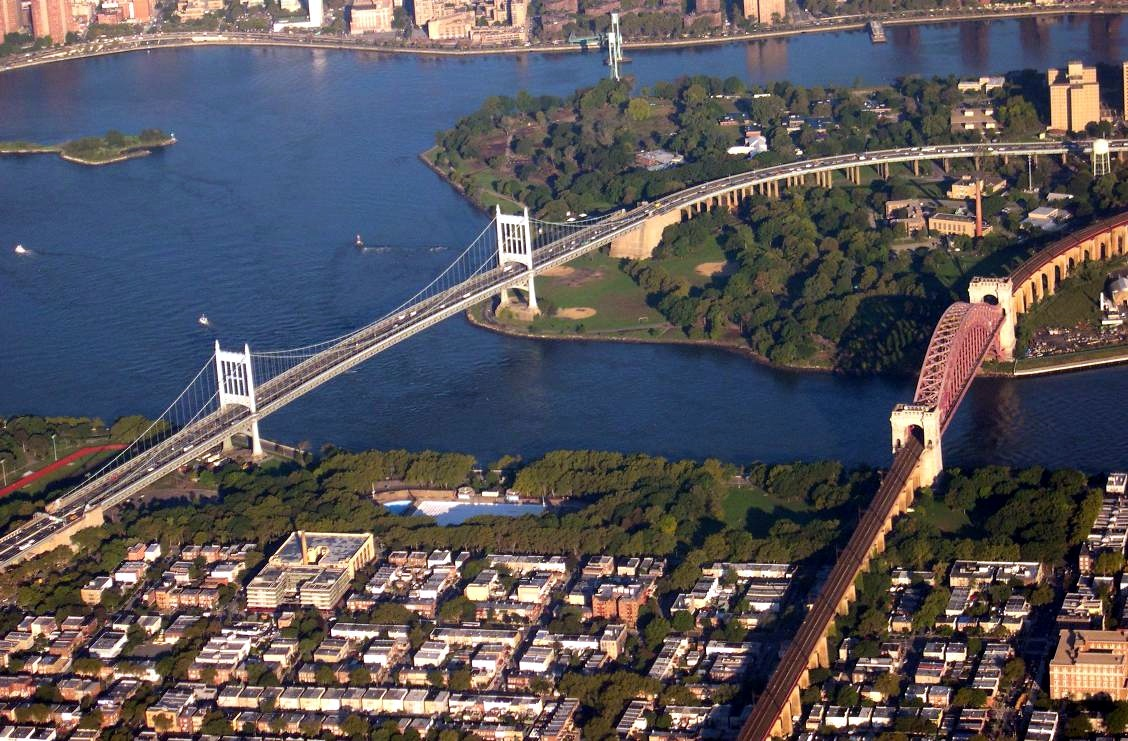
Triborough Bridge, New York City

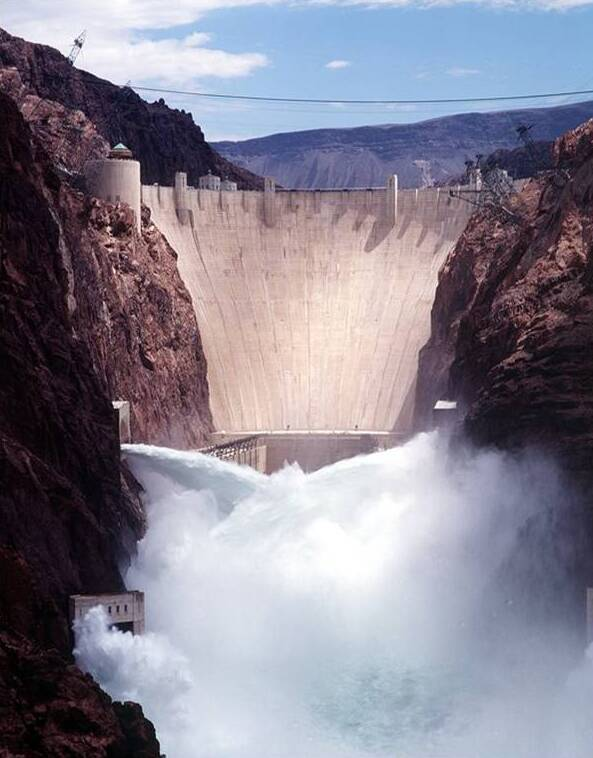
Boulder Dam, Arizona

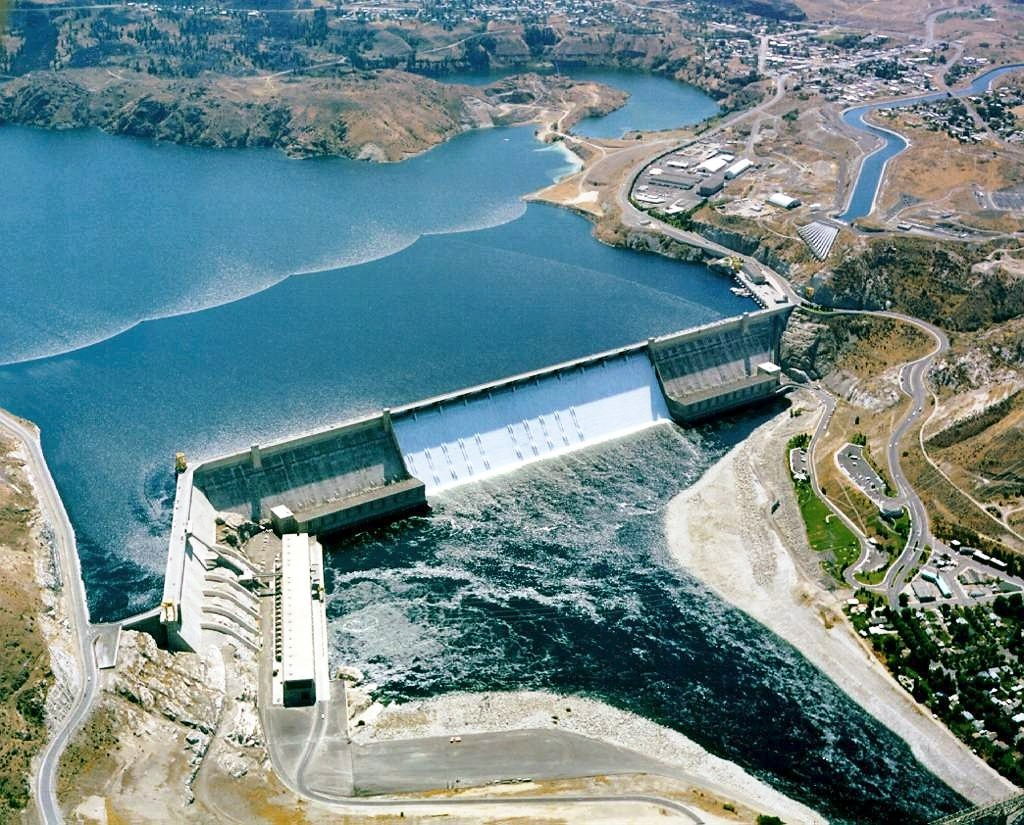
Grand Coulee Dam, Washington

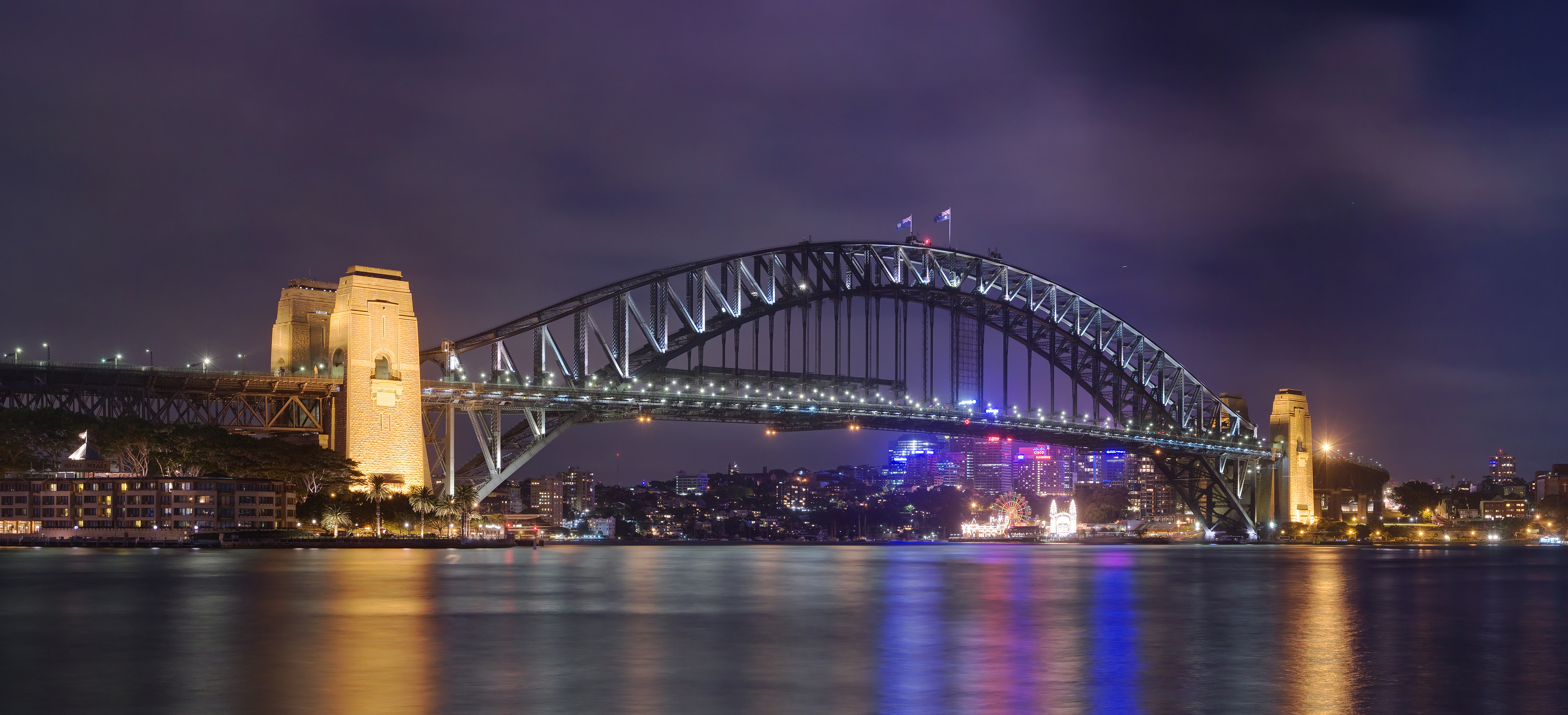
Sydney Harbour Bridge, Australia

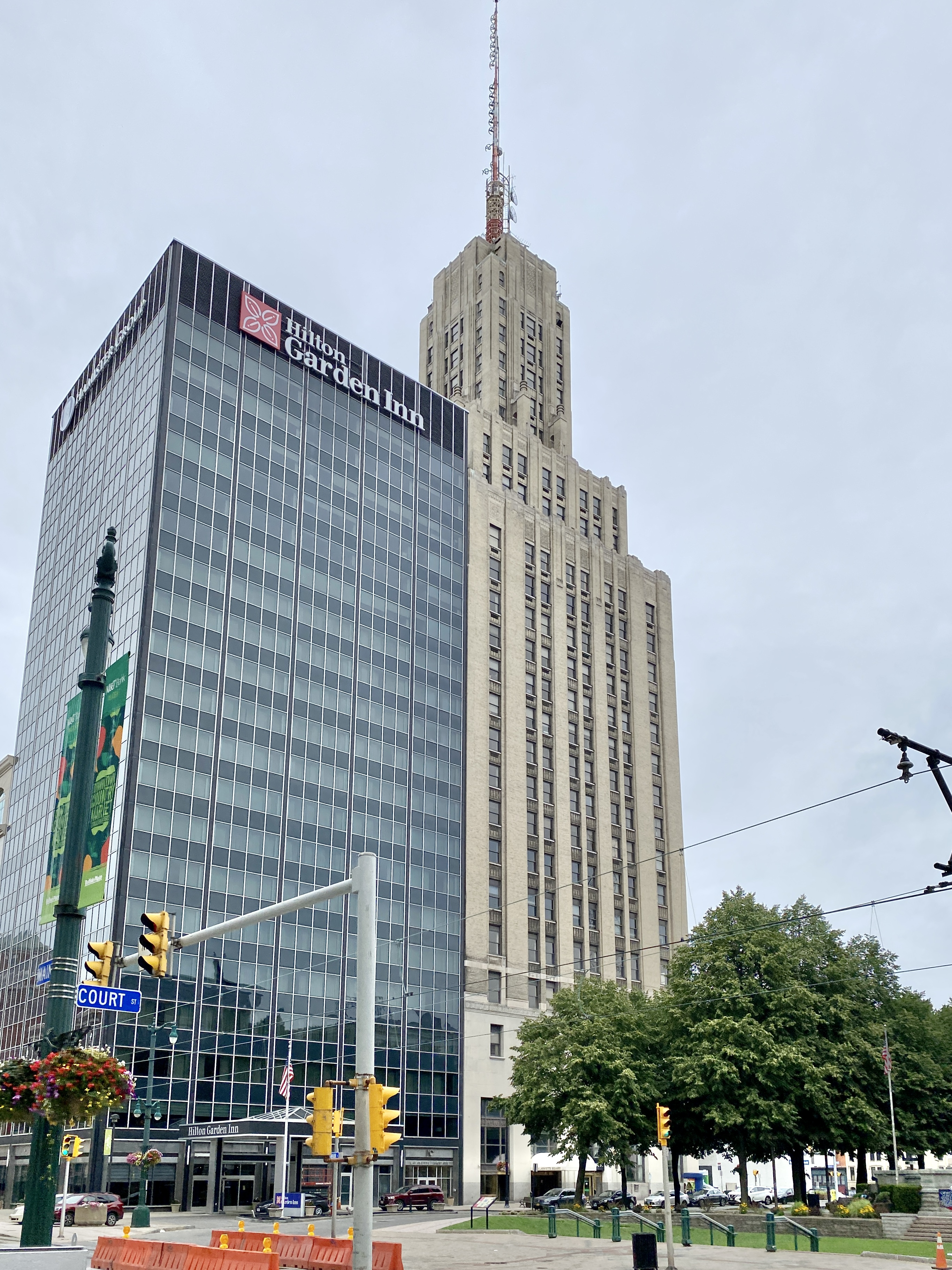
660 Fifth Avenue, New York

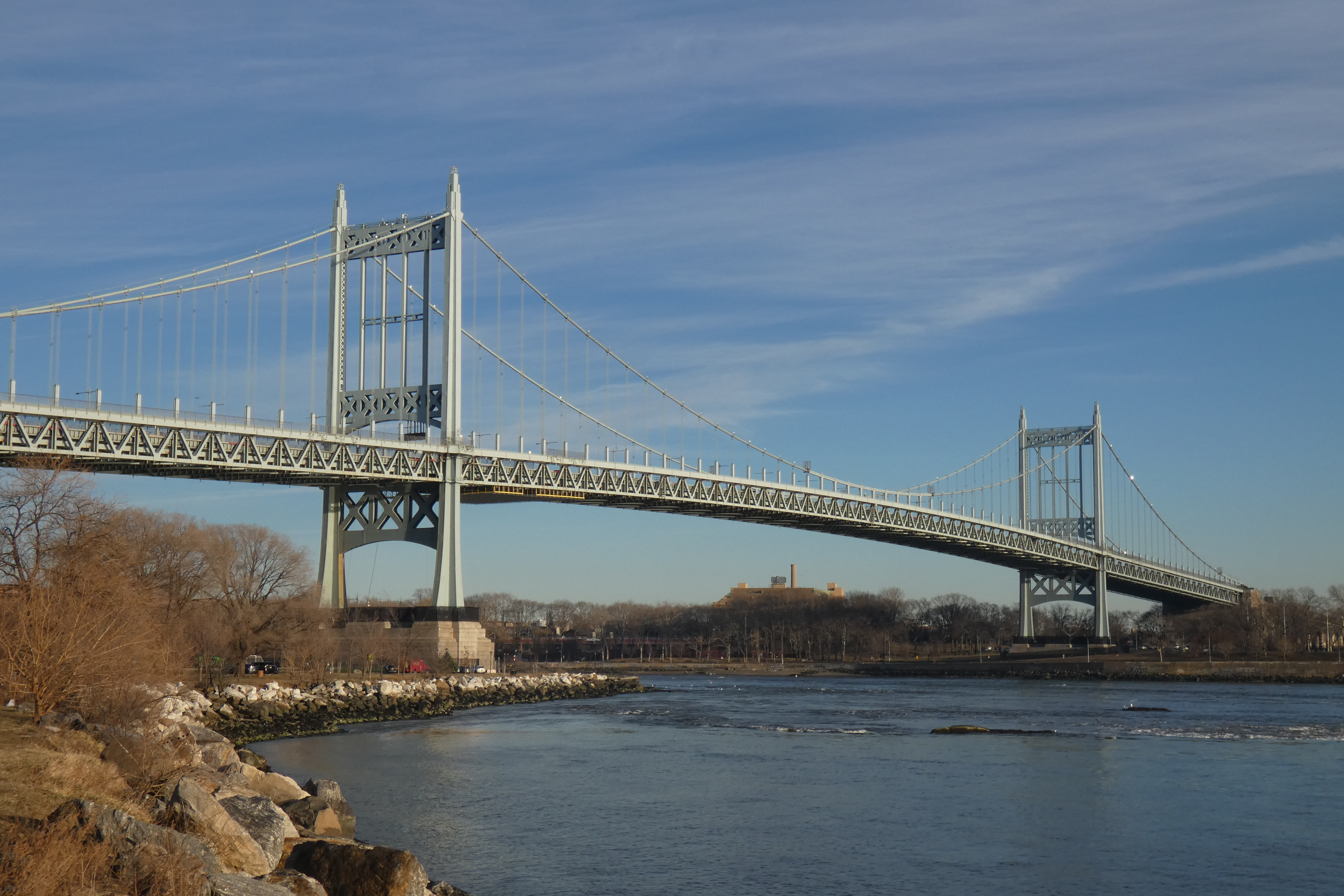
Robert F. Kennedy Bridge (Triborough Bridge), New York

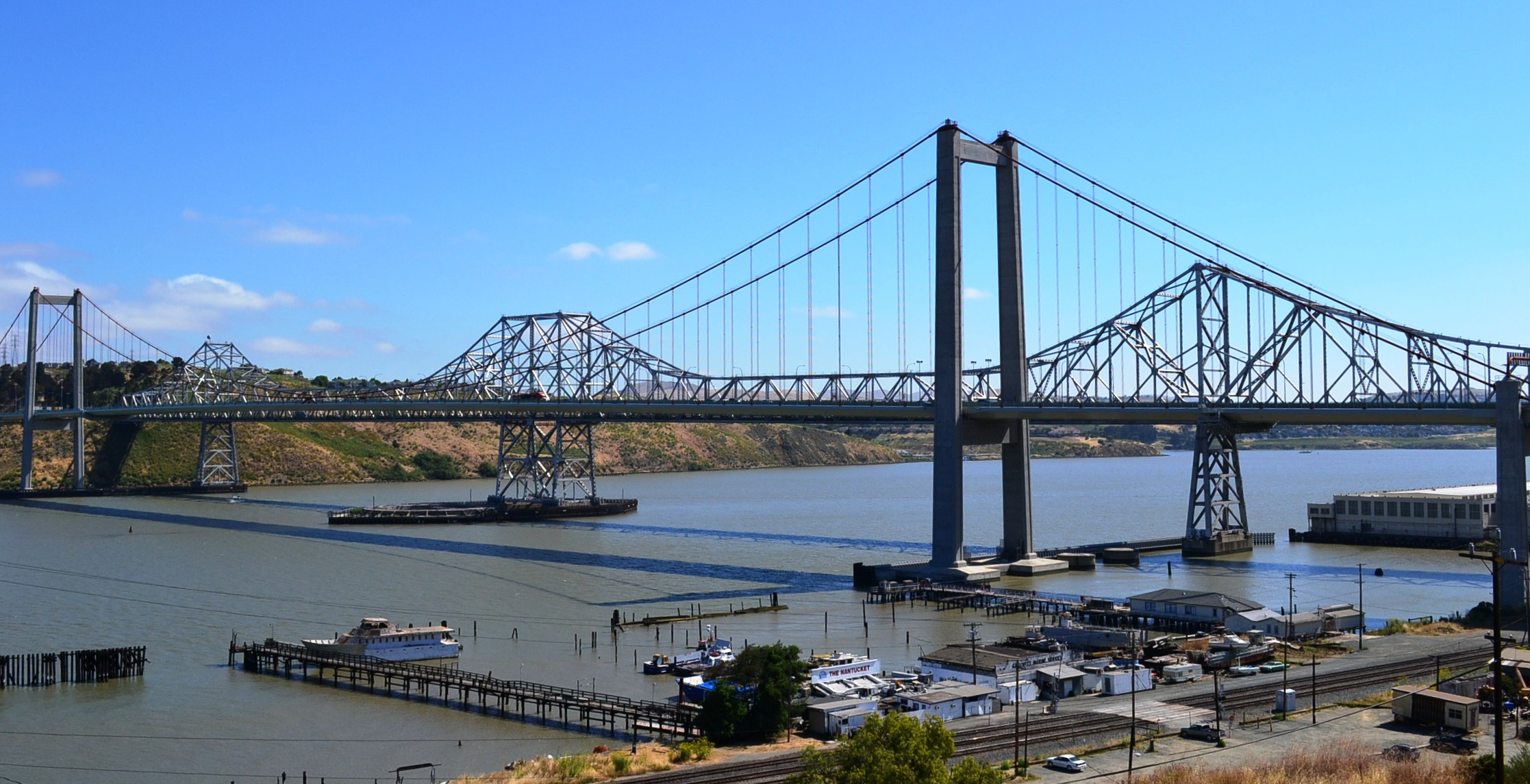
Carquinez Bridge, San Francisco Bay Area, California

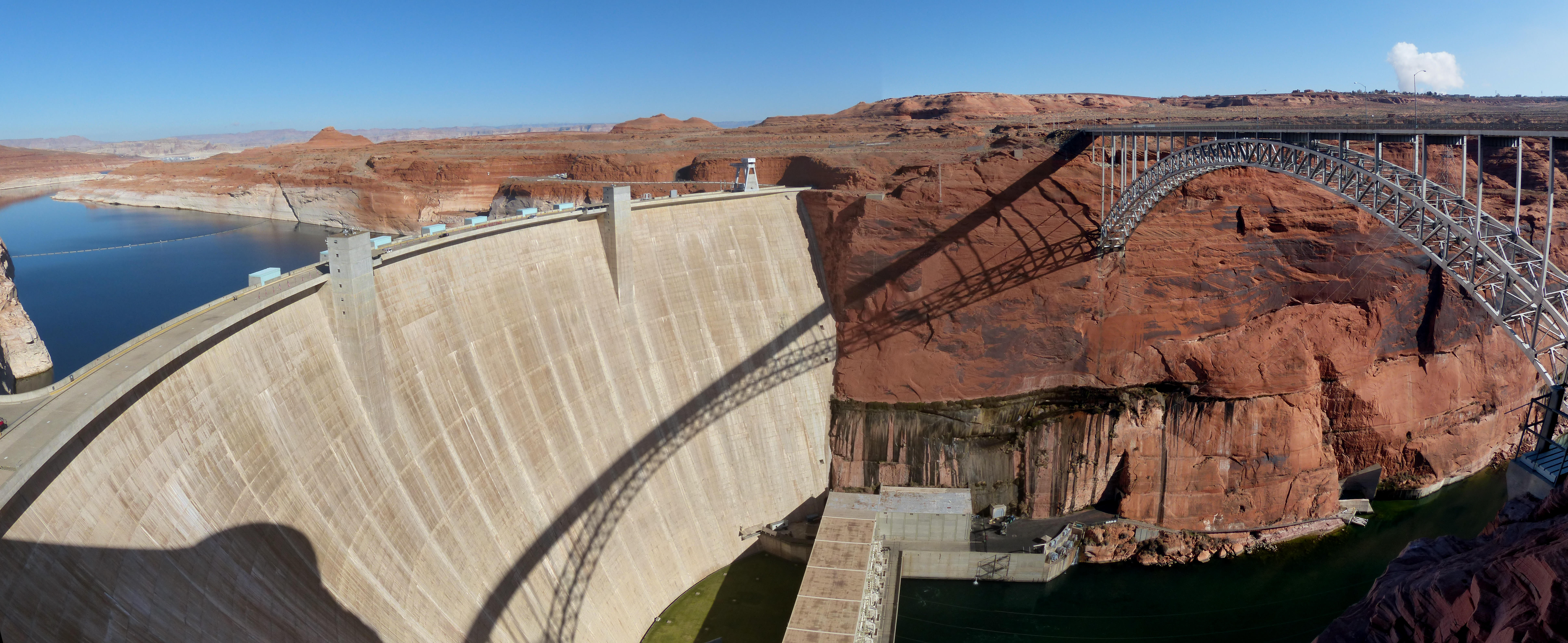
Glen Canyon Dam and Bridge connecting Utah and Arizona

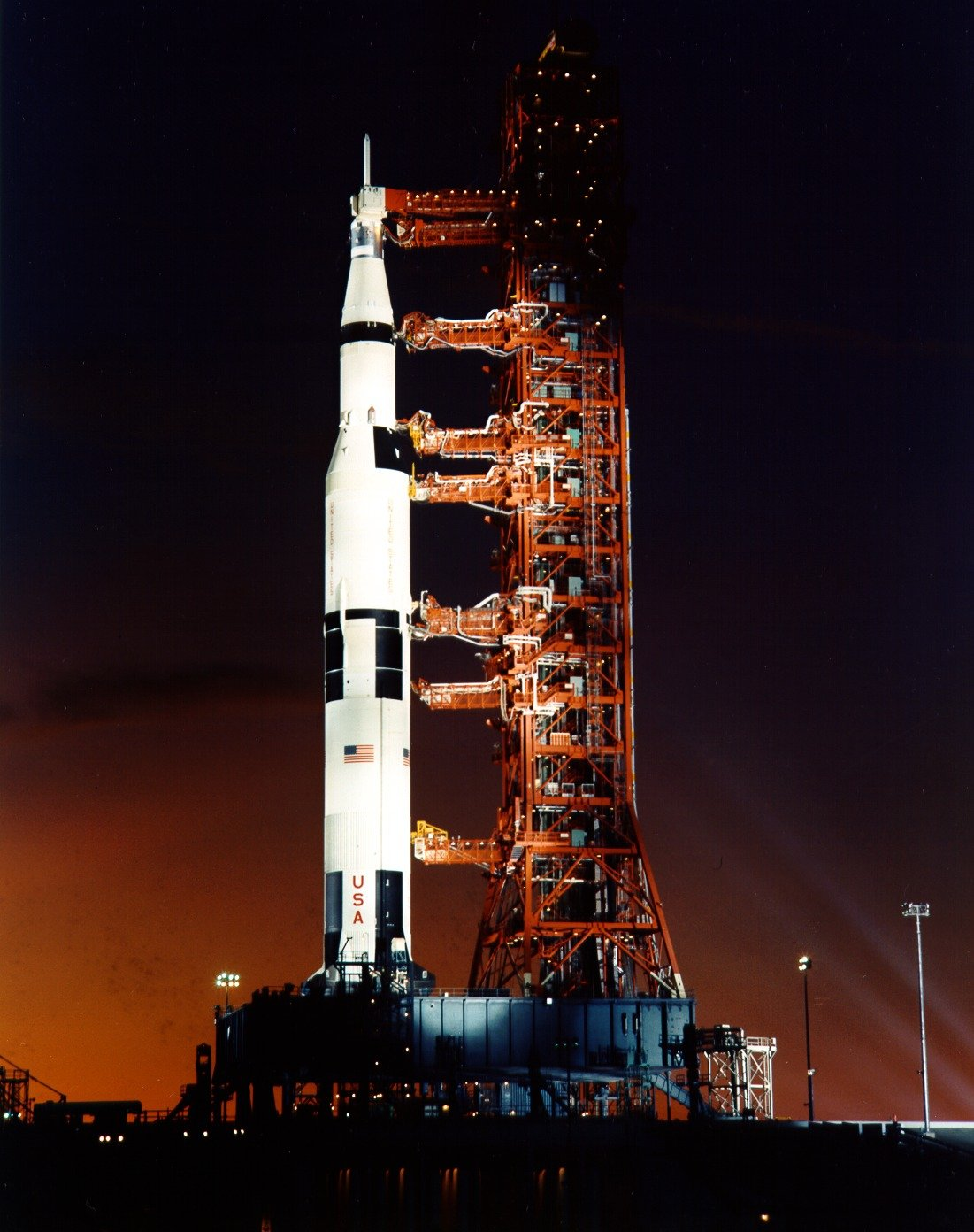
Chicago Pneumatic electric motors were used on the Apollo 8 capsule

== Distribution ==
Chicago Pneumatic products are sold exclusively through authorized distributors worldwide. The distributor network consists of specialized distributors in construction, demolition, vehicle service, industrial maintenance, public works and general industry. CP also made air tools for Sears Craftsman under the "756" model prefix, and in some cases even when branded as Sears Craftsman, still had the trademark "CP" logo on them.
