= Übach-Palenberg =

- Town
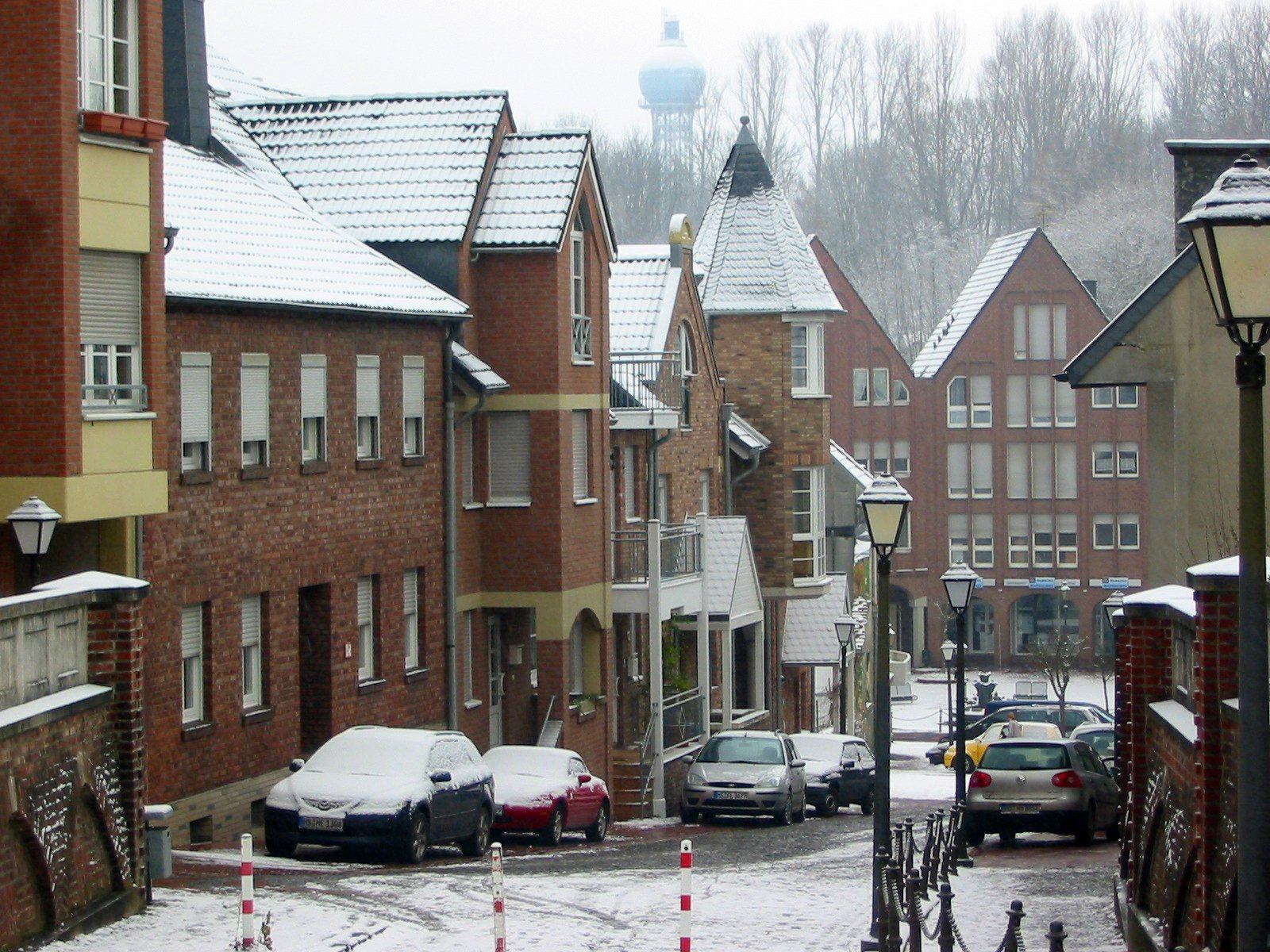
- Übach seen from the church

- Coat of arms

- Location of Übach-Palenberg within Heinsberg district
- Interactive map of Übach-Palenberg
- Location within Germany Location within North Rhine-Westphalia
- Coordinates: 50°55′11″N 6°7′10″E
- Country: Germany
- State: North Rhine-Westphalia
- Admin. region: Köln
- District: Heinsberg

Government
  - Mayor (2025–30): Christine Stadtler (SPD)

Area
  - Total: 26.09 km^{2} (10.07 sq mi)
- Elevation: 110 m (360 ft)

Population (2025-12-31)
  - Total: 24,144
  - Density: 925.4/km^{2} (2,397/sq mi)
- Time zone: UTC+01:00 (CET)
  - Summer (DST): UTC+02:00 (CEST)
- Postal codes: 52531
- Dialling codes: 02451; 02404 (Parts of Boscheln)
- Vehicle registration: HS
- Website: www.uebach-palenberg.de

Übach-Palenberg (German pronunciation: [ˈyːbax ˈpaːlənbɛʁk]; Limburgish: Übach-Pallebersch) is a town in the Heinsberg district of North Rhine-Westphalia, Germany. It was formed by the merger of two villages, Palenberg and Übach.

== Geography ==
The town is located at the border with the Netherlands, at approx. 10 km east of Heerlen and 15 km north of Aachen. The river Wurm flows through the area. The town has an area of 26.106 km^{2}. More than half the area is agricultural.

== History ==
- 867 the village Palenberg was first mentioned in a written document, 1172 the village Übach. 1794 three Bürgermeistereien were created - Übach, Scherpenseel, Frelenberg - which were merged into one municipality in 1935. It received town rights in 1967.
- 1917 coal mining was started in the town, until in 1962 the Carolus Magnus coal-mine was closed.

== Population ==
Historical population

Year	Pop.	±% p.a.
1965	22,735	—
1970	22,973	+0.21%
1975	22,394	−0.51%
1980	22,868	+0.42%
1985	22,725	−0.13%
1990	23,521	+0.69%
1995	23,849	+0.28%

Year	Pop.	±% p.a.
2000	24,804	+0.79%
2005	25,405	+0.48%
2010	24,779	−0.50%
2015	24,377	−0.33%
2020	23,906	−0.39%
2025	24,144	+0.20%

Source: Landesdatabank Nordrhein-Westfalen

== Coat of arms ==
The coat of arms of the town is subdivided into three fields. In the top blue field are two crossed golden scepters with lily heads, with a black letter T on top. Both symbols refer to the Grundherrschaft Thorn. In the left golden field is a black lion, the symbol of Jülich, as both Frelenberg and Palenberg belonged to the county Jülich. To the right is a silver lion on a red field, the symbol of Heinsberg, which Scherpenseel historically belonged to. The coat of arms was granted on December 2, 1937 by the Oberpräsident of the province Rhineland.

== Economy ==
In addition to international companies such as SLV, Neuman & Esser, Schlafhorst or Spanset the company Solent GmbH & Co. KG has been producing chocolate, nuts and dried fruit for various brands in Übach-Palenberg since 2010. Its sister company, Bonback GmbH & Co. KG, a wholesale bakery, produces at the same location.

== Twin towns – sister cities ==
Übach-Palenberg is twinned with:

- Rosny-sous-Bois, France (1990)
- Landgraaf, Netherlands (2000)

== Gallery ==
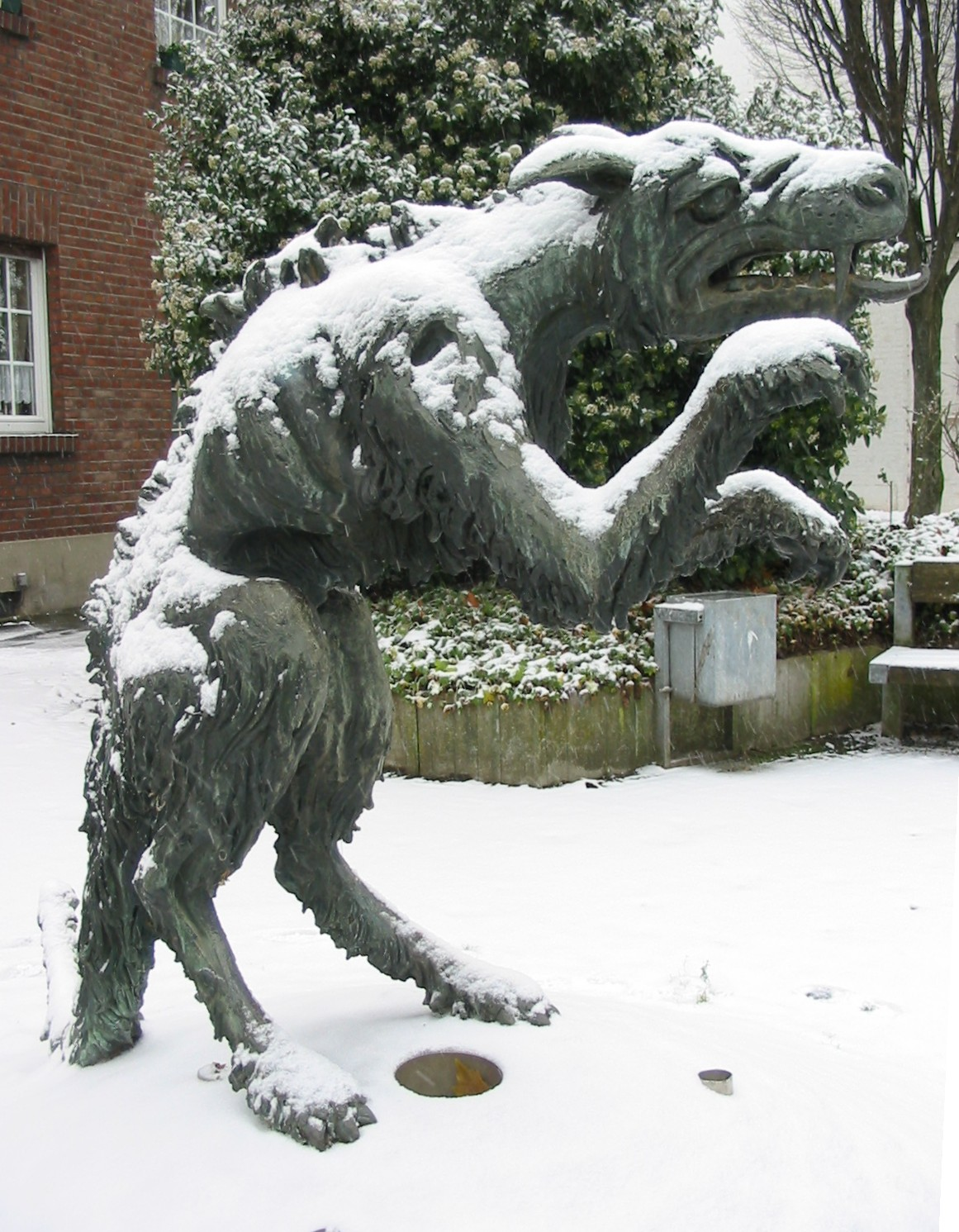
"Der Platschhonk", a legendary creature
