= G8 =

Intergovernmental political forum (1997–2014)

Map of G8 member nations and the European Union

The Group of Eight (G8) was an intergovernmental political forum from 1997 to 2014, formed by incorporating Russia into the G7. The G8 became the G7 again after Russia was expelled in 2014 following the Russian annexation of Crimea.

The forum originated with a 1975 summit hosted by France that brought together representatives of six governments: France, Germany, Italy, Japan, the United Kingdom, and the United States, thus leading to the name Group of Six or G6. The summit came to be known as the "Group of Seven" in 1976 with the addition of Canada. The European Union (or predecessor institutions such as the European Economic Community) was represented at the G8 since the 1980s as a "nonenumerated" participant, but originally could not host or chair summits. Russia was added to the political forum from 1997, which the following year became known as the G8. In 2005, the UK government initiated the practice of inviting five leading emerging markets – Brazil, China, India, Mexico, and South Africa – to participate in the G8 meetings that came to be known as G8+5.

"G8" referred to the member states in aggregate or to the annual summit meeting of the G8 heads of government. Each calendar year, the responsibility of hosting the G8 was rotated through the member states in the following order: France, United States, United Kingdom, Russia, Germany, Japan, Italy, and Canada. The holder of the presidency sets the agenda, hosts the summit for that year, and determines which ministerial meetings will take place. G8 ministers also met throughout the year, such as the G8 finance ministers (who meet four times a year), G8 foreign ministers, or G8 environment ministers.

The G8 countries were not strictly the largest in the world nor the highest-income per capita, but they did represent the largest high-income countries. With the G20 major economies growing in stature since the 2008 Washington summit, world leaders from the group announced at their Pittsburgh summit in September 2009 that the group would replace the G8 as the main economic council of wealthy nations. Collectively, in 2012 the G8 nations comprised 50.1 percent of 2012 global nominal GDP, 40.9 percent of global GDP (PPP) and 60.9 percent of 2024 global stock market capitalization. In March 2014 Russia was suspended indefinitely following the annexation of Crimea, whereupon the political forum name reverted to G7. The 2014 G7 summit was hosted and chaired by the European Union instead of Russia.

== History ==
Following 1994's G7 summit in Naples, Russian officials held separate meetings with leaders of the G7 after the group's summits. This informal arrangement was dubbed the Political 8 (P8)—or, colloquially, the G7+1. At the invitation of UK Prime Minister Tony Blair and U.S. President Bill Clinton, President Boris Yeltsin was invited first as a guest observer, later as a full participant. It was seen as a way to encourage Yeltsin with his capitalist reforms. Russia formally joined the group in 1998, resulting in the Group of Eight, or G8.

=== Focus of G8 ===
After the 2008 financial crisis, the G20 replaced the G8 as the world's main international economic council. Nevertheless, the G8 retained its relevance as a "steering group for the West", with special significance appointed to Japan. The 40th summit was the first time the European Union was able to host and chair a summit.

A major focus of the G8 since 2009 has been the global supply of food. At the 2009 L'Aquila summit, the G8's members promised to contribute $22 billion to the issue. By 2015, 93% of funds had been disbursed to projects like sustainable agriculture development and adequate emergency food aid assistance.

At the 2012 summit, President Barack Obama asked G8 leaders to adopt the New Alliance for Food Security and Nutrition initiative to "help the rural poor produce more food and sell it in thriving local and regional markets as well as on the global market". Ghana became one of the first six African countries to sign up to the G8 New Alliance for Food Security and Nutrition in 2012. There was, however, almost no knowledge of the G8 initiative among some stakeholders, including farmers, academics and agricultural campaign groups. Confusion surrounding the plans was made worse, critics say, by "a dizzying array of regional and national agriculture programmes that are inaccessible to ordinary people".

=== Russia's participation suspension (2014) ===
On 24 March 2014, the G7 members cancelled the planned G8 summit that was to be held in June of that year in the Russian city of Sochi, and suspended Russia's membership of the group, due to Russia's annexation of Crimea; nevertheless, they stopped short of outright permanent expulsion. Russian foreign minister Sergei Lavrov downplayed the importance of the decision by the U.S. and its allies, and pointed out that major international decisions were made by the G20 countries.

Later on, the Italian Foreign Affairs minister Federica Mogherini and other Italian authorities, along with the EastWest Institute board member Wolfgang Ischinger, suggested that Russia may restore its membership in the group. In April 2015, the German foreign minister Frank-Walter Steinmeier said that Russia would be welcomed to return to G8 provided the Minsk Protocol were implemented. In 2016, he added that "none of the major international conflicts can be solved without Russia", and the G7 countries will consider Russia's return to the group in 2017. The same year, Japanese Prime Minister Shinzō Abe called for Russia's return to G8, stating that Russia's involvement is "crucial to tackling multiple crises in the Middle East". In January 2017, the Italian foreign minister Angelino Alfano said that Italy hopes for "resuming the G8 format with Russia and ending the atmosphere of the Cold War".

On 13 January 2017, Russia announced that it would permanently leave the G8 grouping. In January 2017, Russia announced its permanent withdrawal from the G8. However, several representatives of G7 countries stated that they would be interested in Russia's return to the group. Christian Lindner, the leader of Free Democratic Party of Germany and member of the Bundestag, said that Putin should be "asked to join the table of the G7" so that one could "talk with him and not about him", and "we cannot make all things dependent on the situation in Crimea". In April 2018, the German politicians and members of the Bundestag Sahra Wagenknecht and Alexander Graf Lambsdorff said that Russia should be invited back to the group and attend the 2018 summit in Canada: "Russia should again be at the table during the [June] summit at the latest" because "peace in Europe and also in the Middle East is only possible with Russia". The US President Donald Trump also stated that Russia should be reinstated to the group; his appeal was supported by the Italian Prime Minister Giuseppe Conte. After several G7 members quickly rejected US President Trump's suggestion to again accept the Russian Federation into the G8, Russian Foreign Minister Lavrov said that the Russian Federation wasn't interested in rejoining the political forum. He also said that the G20 is sufficient for the Russian Federation. In the final statement of the 2018 meeting in Canada, the G7 members announced to continue sanctions and also to be ready to take further restrictive measures against the Russian Federation for the failure of Minsk Agreement complete implementation.

=== A "new G8" ===
On 11 June 2022, Vyacheslav Volodin, the current Chairman of the State Duma, announced on Telegram that "countries wishing to build an equal dialogue and mutually beneficial relations would actually form, together with Russia, a 'new G8'". Although Volodin mentioned the group of eight countries not participating in the sanctions against the Russian Federation—China, India, Indonesia, Brazil, Mexico, Iran, and Turkey—there have been no updates regarding the new G8; however, five of the seven nations listed are already a part of BRICS.

== Structure and activities ==
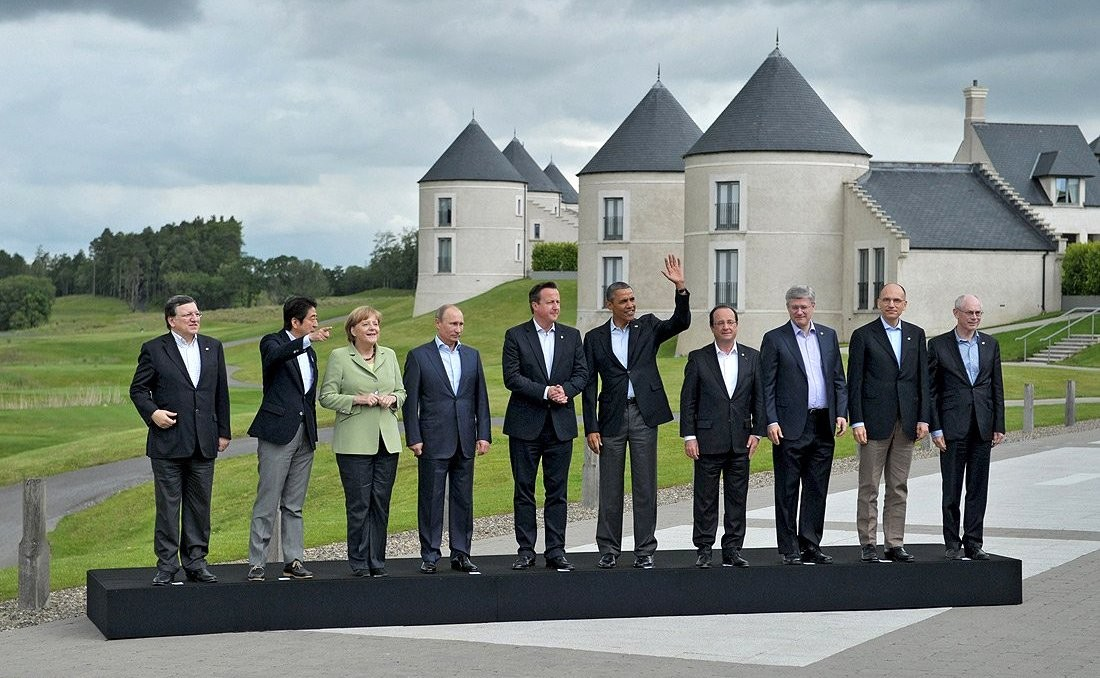
Leaders of the G8 on 18 June 2013, in Lough Erne, Northern Ireland

By design, the G8 deliberately lacked an administrative structure like those for international organizations, such as the United Nations or the World Bank. The group does not have a permanent secretariat, or offices for its members.

The presidency of the group rotates annually among member countries, with each new term beginning on 1 January of the year. The rotation order is: France, the United States, the United Kingdom, Russia (suspended), Germany, Japan, Italy, and Canada. The country holding the presidency is responsible for planning and hosting a series of ministerial-level meetings, leading up to a mid-year summit attended by the heads of government. The president of the European Commission participates as an equal in all summit events.

The ministerial meetings bring together ministers responsible for various portfolios to discuss issues of mutual or global concern. The range of topics include health, law enforcement, labor, economic and social development, energy, environment, foreign affairs, justice and interior, terrorism, and trade. There are also a separate set of meetings known as the G8+5, created during the 2005 Gleneagles, Scotland summit, that is attended by finance and energy ministers from all eight member countries in addition to the five "outreach countries" which are also known as the Group of Five—Brazil, People's Republic of China, India, Mexico, and South Africa.

In June 2005, justice ministers and interior ministers from the G8 countries agreed to launch an international database on pedophiles. The G8 officials also agreed to pool data on terrorism, subject to restrictions by privacy and security laws in individual countries.

=== Global energy ===
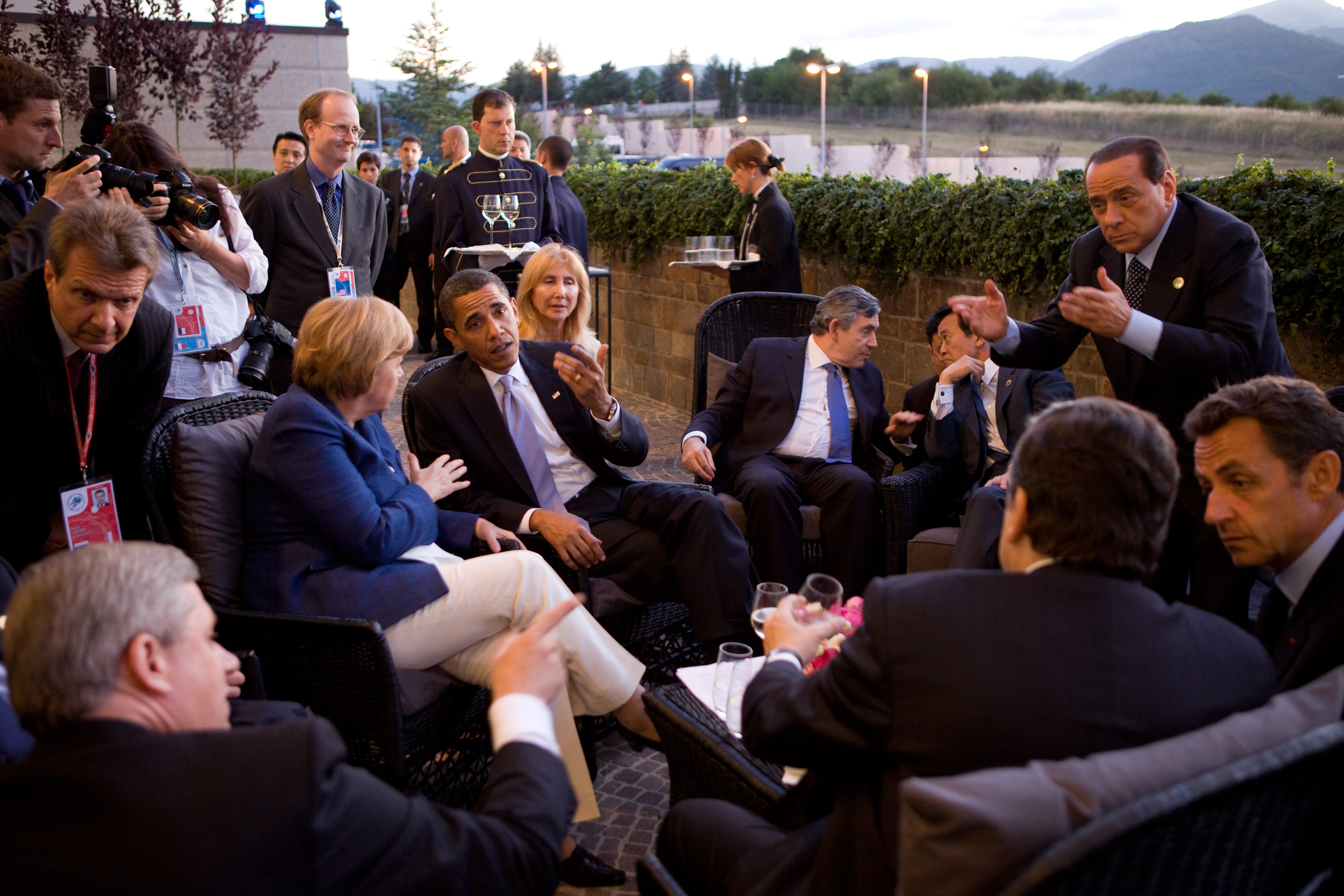
G8 leaders confer during the 2009 summit in L'Aquila (Abruzzo, Italy).

At the Heiligendamm Summit in 2007, the G8 acknowledged a proposal from the EU for a worldwide initiative on efficient energy use. They agreed to explore, along with the International Energy Agency, the most effective means to promote energy efficiency internationally. A year later, on 8 June 2008, the G8 along with China, India, South Korea and the European Community established the International Partnership for Energy Efficiency Cooperation, at the Energy Ministerial meeting hosted by Japan holding 2008 G8 Presidency, in Aomori.

G8 Finance Ministers, whilst in preparation for the 34th Summit of the G8 Heads of State and Government in Toyako, Hokkaido, met on the 13 and 14 June 2008, in Osaka, Japan. They agreed to the "G8 Action Plan for Climate Change to Enhance the Engagement of Private and Public Financial Institutions". In closing, Ministers supported the launch of new Climate Investment Funds (CIFs) by the World Bank, which will help existing efforts until a new framework under the UNFCCC is implemented after 2012. The UNFCCC is not on track to meeting any of its stated goals.

In July 2005, the G8 Summit endorsed the IPHE in its Plan of Action on Climate Change, Clean Energy and Sustainable Development, and identified it as a medium of cooperation and collaboration to develop clean energy technologies.

=== Annual summit ===
The first G8 summit was held in 1997 after Russia formally joined the G7 group, and the last one was held in 2013. The 2014 summit was scheduled to be held in Russia. However, due to Crimea's annexation by the Russian Federation, the other seven countries decided to hold a separate meeting without Russia as a G7 summit in Brussels, Belgium.

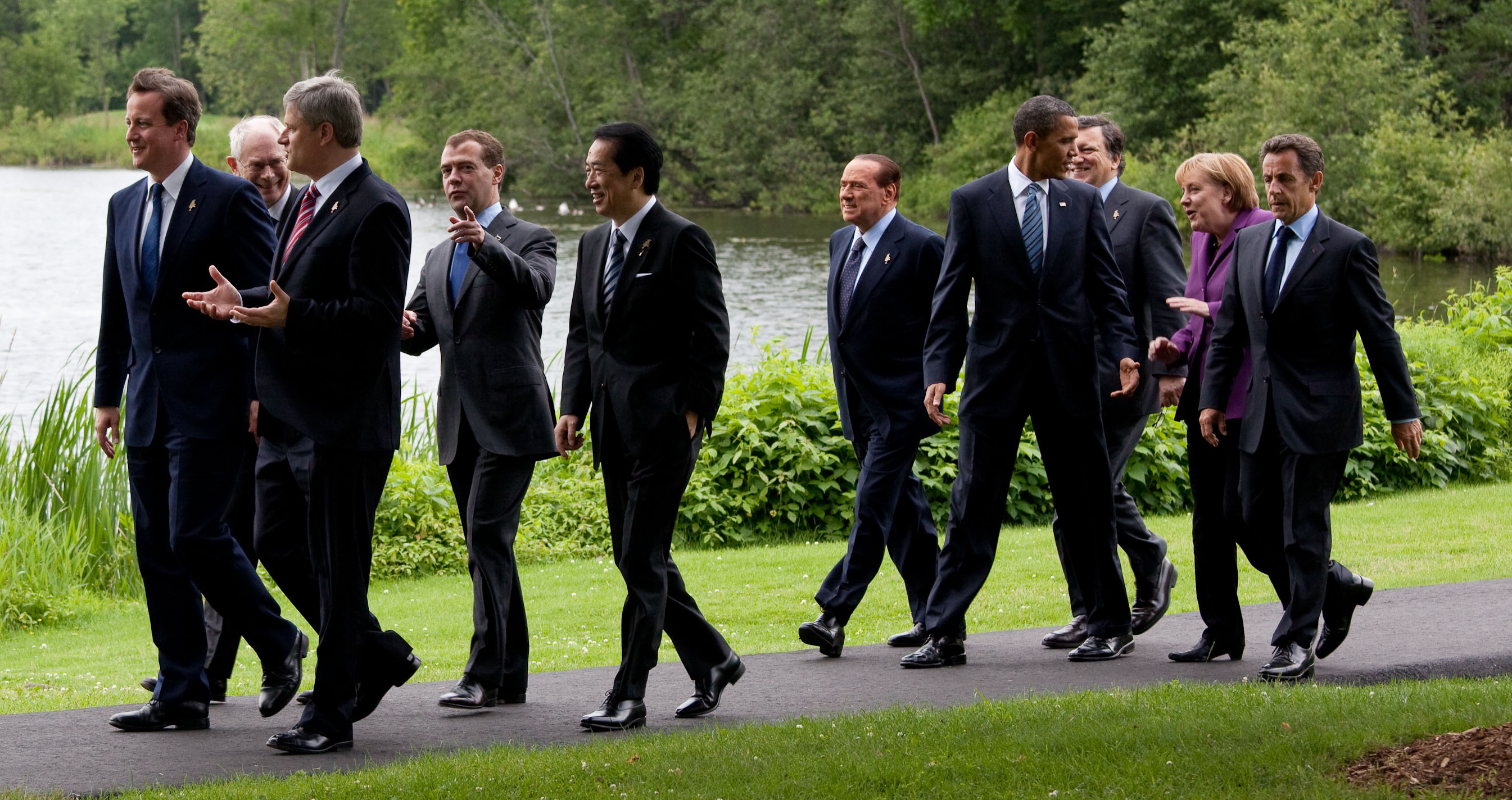
The G8 leaders at the 36th summit in Huntsville, Ontario. Left to right: Cameron, Van Rompuy (European Council), Harper, Medvedev, Kan, Berlusconi, Obama, Barroso (European Commission), Merkel, Sarkozy.

== Criticism ==
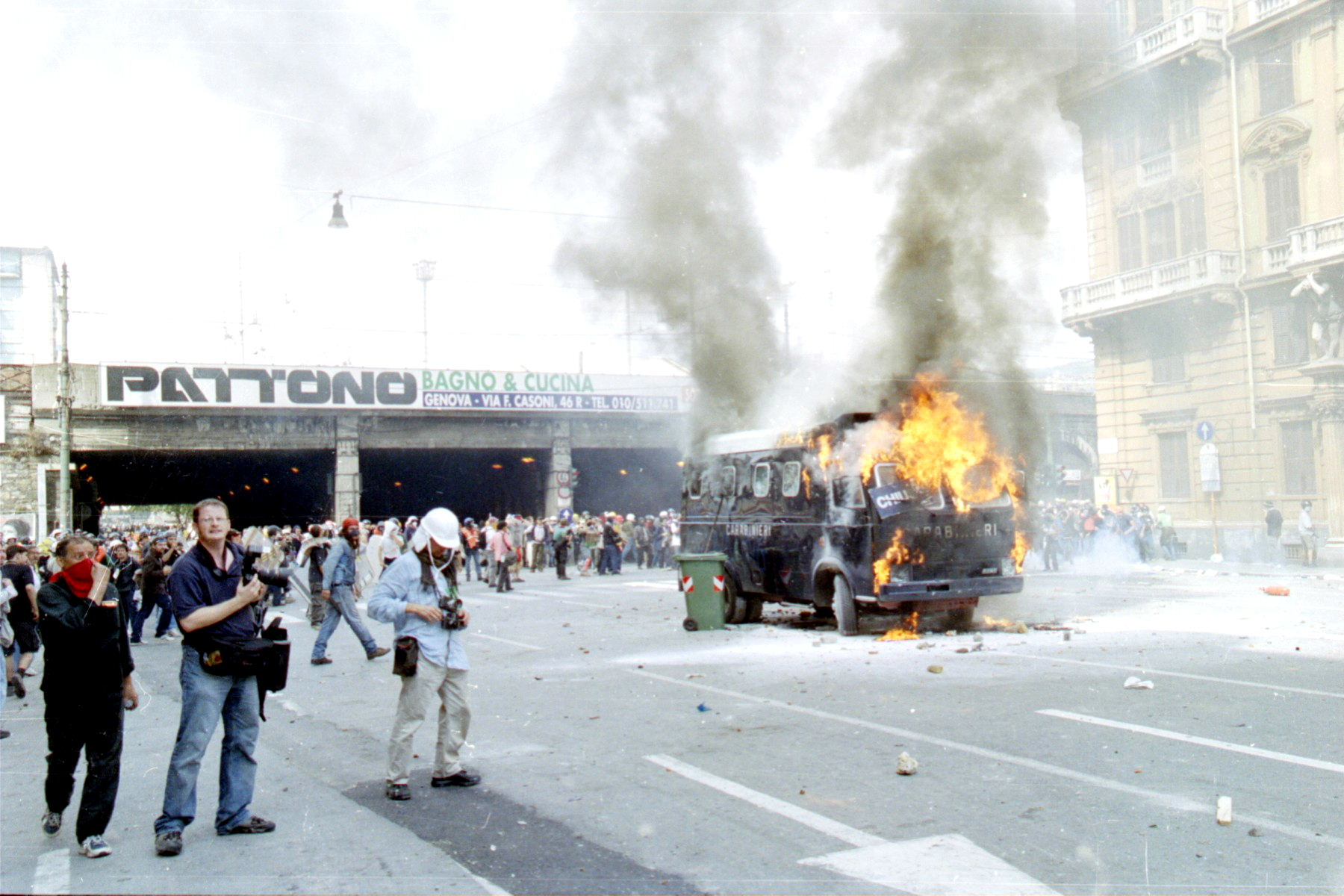
20 July 2001, 27th G8 summit in Genoa, Italy: Protesters burn a police vehicle.

One type of criticism is that members of G8 do not do enough to help global problems, due to strict patent policy and other issues related to globalization. In Unraveling Global Apartheid, political analyst Titus Alexander described the G7, as it was in 1996, as the 'cabinet' of global minority rule, with a coordinating role in world affairs.

In 2012 The Heritage Foundation, an American conservative think tank, criticized the G8 for advocating food security without making room for economic freedom.

== Relevance ==
The G8's relevance has been subject to debate from 2008 onward. It represented the major industrialized countries but critics argued that the G8 no longer represented the world's most powerful economies, as China has surpassed every economy but the United States.

Vladimir Putin did not attend the 2012 G8 summit at Camp David, causing Foreign Policy magazine to remark that the summit has generally outlived its usefulness as a viable international gathering of foreign leaders. Two years later, Russia was suspended from the G8, then chose to leave permanently in January 2017.

The G20 major economies leaders' summit has had an increased level of international prestige and influence. However, British Prime Minister David Cameron said of the G8 in 2012:

Some people ask, does the G8 still matter, when we have a Group of 20? My answer is, yes. The G8 is a group of like-minded countries that share a belief in free enterprise as the best route to growth. As eight countries making up about half the world's gross domestic product, the standards we set, the commitments we make, and the steps we take can help solve vital global issues, fire up economies and drive prosperity all over the world.

== Youth 8 Summit ==
The Y8 Summit or simply Y8, formerly known as the G8 Youth Summit is the youth counterpart to the G8 summit. The summits were organized from 2006 to 2013. The first summit to use the name Y8 took place in May 2012 in Puebla, Mexico, alongside the Youth G8 that took place in Washington, D.C. the same year. From 2016 onwards, similar youth conferences were organized under the name Y7 Summit.

The Y8 Summit brings together young leaders from G8 nations and the European Union to facilitate discussions of international affairs, promote cross-cultural understanding, and build global friendships. The conference closely follows the formal negotiation procedures of the G8 Summit. The Y8 Summit represents the innovative voice of young adults between the age of 18 and 35. At the end of the summit, the delegates jointly come up with a consensus-based written statement, the Final Communiqué. This document is subsequently presented to G8 leaders in order to inspire positive change.

The Y8 Summit was organized annually by a global network of youth-led organizations called The IDEA (The International Diplomatic Engagement Association). The organizations undertake the selection processes for their respective national delegations, while the hosting country is responsible for organizing the summit. An example of such a youth-led organization is the Young European Leadership association, which recruits and sends EU Delegates.

The goal of the Y8 Summit is to bring together young people from around the world to allow the voices and opinions of young generations to be heard and to encourage them to take part in global decision-making processes.

	Summit	Year	Host country	Location
1st	International Student Model G8	2006	Russia	Saint Petersburg
2nd	Model G8 Youth Summit	2007	Germany	Berlin
3rd	Model G8 Youth Summit	2008	Japan	Yokohama
4th	G8 Youth Summit	2009	Italy	Milan
5th	G8 Youth Summit	2010	Canada	Muskoka & Toronto
6th	G8 Youth Summit	2011	France	Paris
**	Y8 Summit	2012	Mexico	Puebla
7th	G8 Youth Summit	2012	United States	Washington D.C.
8th	Y8 summit	2013	United Kingdom	London
9th	Y8 summit	2014	Russia	Moscow*

*The Y8 Summit 2014 in Moscow was suspended due to the suspension of Russia from the G8.

== See also ==
- D-8 Organization for Economic Cooperation
- Eight-Nation Alliance
- Forum for the Future (Bahrain 2005)
- G3 Free Trade Agreement
- G4 (EU)
- G-20 major economies
- Group of Two
- Group of Seven
- Group of Eleven
- Group of 15
- Group of 24
- Group of 30
- Junior 8
- List of countries by GDP (nominal)
- List of countries by military expenditures
- List of country groupings
- List of G8 leaders
- List of G8 summit resorts
- List of longest serving G8 leaders
- List of multilateral free-trade agreements
- Global North and Global South
- Western Bloc
- Great power
- World Social Forum
