= International Partnership for Hydrogen and Fuel Cells in the Economy =

Hydrogen fuel intergovernmental partnership

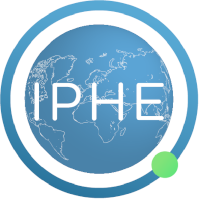

Agency overview
- Formed: 2003
- Type: Sustainable energy advocacy
- Jurisdiction: Multinational
- Agency executives: Paulo Emilio de Miranda, Chair; Noé van Hulst, Noriya Udagawa, Amandeep Garcha, Dimitrios Papageorgopoulos, Vice Chairs; Laurent Antoni, Executive Director
- Website: https://www.iphe.net/

The International Partnership for Hydrogen and Fuel Cells in the Economy (IPHE) is a Government-to-Government partnership founded in 2003 consisting of 27 countries and the European Commission. The IPHE works with the member countries in order to further develop and implement those technologies.

== History ==
The International Partnership for Hydrogen and Fuel Cells in the Economy was founded in 2003 to help create cooperation between different governments in developing hydrogen and fuel cell technology. The IPHE contains three working groups: the Education & Skills Working Group, the Regulations, Codes, Standards, & Safety Working Group, and the Hydrogen Environmental Impact Assessment Working Group. Working Groups host Task Forces in the partnership such as the Hydrogen Certification Mechanisms, the Trade Rules, The Hydrogen Skills, the Maritime and the Hydrogen Bulk Storage task forces. In July 2005, the G8 Summit endorsed the IPHE in its plan of action on climate change, clean energy, and sustainable development and identified it as a means of cooperation to develop clean energy technologies. The United States was the chair of the IPHE from 2003 to 2007 and 2018 to 2021. The partnership held a student outreach meeting at the University of Maryland in 2023.

== Member Countries ==
The IPHE consists of 27 member countries and The European Commission. Kenya is the most recent country to join in 2026 after Croatia and Mauritania in 2025.

- Australia
- Austria
- Belgium
- Brazil
- Canada
- Chile
- China
- Costa Rica
- Croatia
- European Commission
- France
- Germany
- Iceland
- India
- Italy
- Japan
- Kenya
- Republic of Korea
- Mauritania
- Netherlands
- Republic of South Africa
- Saudi Arabia
- Singapore
- Switzerland
- United Arab Emirates
- United Kingdom
- United States
- Uruguay

== See also ==
- Fuel Cell and Hydrogen Energy Association
- Department of Energy
- Sustainable energy
