= Young European Leadership =

International non-profit organization

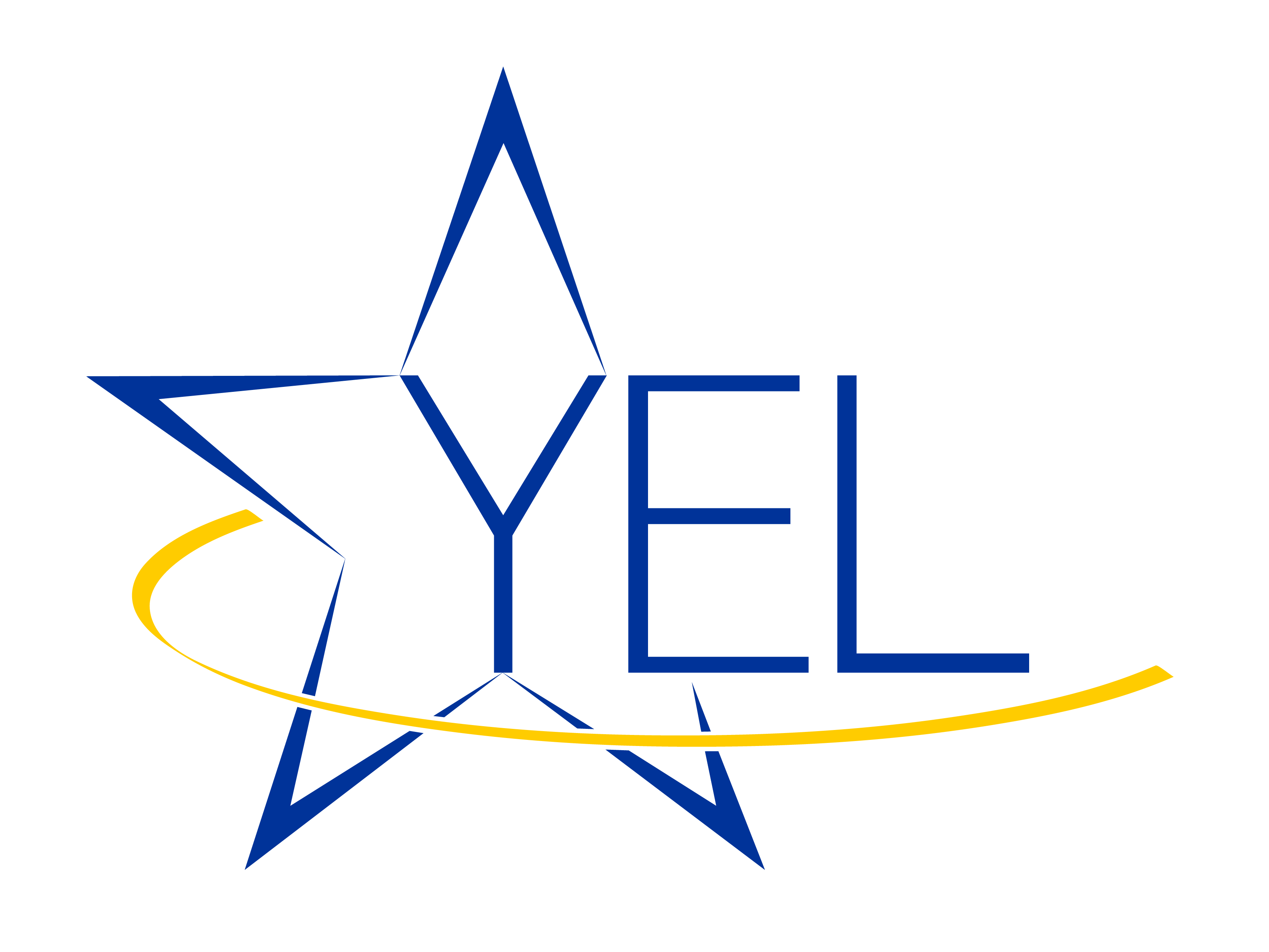
- Abbreviation: YEL
- Formation: 2013
- Type: International non-profit organization
- Headquarters: Boulevard Anspach, 169, 1000 Brussels, Belgium
- Official language: English
- President: Augusto Gonzalez
- Website: http://www.younglead.eu

Young European Leadership (YEL), an international award winning non-profit and nonpartisan organization composed of and founded by young Europeans, aims to bring young professionals into European and global politics. Among its activities, YEL organizes the European Union's delegations to the Y7 and Y20 Summits, as well as youth-centered delegations to the annual UNFCCC conferences, the UN CSW, and other events, including the Paris Peace Forum.

== History ==
Young European Leadership was founded in Brussels in 2013 with the main goal of recruiting the delegates of the European Union for future Y8 and Y20 Summits. The Co-Founders were Tillmann Heidelk (President), Flóra Rétvalvi (Vice President), Diana Carter (Secretary General), Jeroen Stevens (Treasurer), and Radoslav Šoth as a co-founding non-board member. The organization won the prestigious European Charlemagne Youth Prize in 2016 for its work on the Young European Council.

The organization has since expanded its size and scope to handle several more conferences and events on a yearly basis, including hosting its own YEL Annual Summit and being a large European youth representative at the UNFCCC. Since 2024, YEL has been part of the EU Stakeholders Group, placing it among the top 40 youth organizations in the European Union. The organization specializes on foreign affairs and European foreign policy, focusing its efforts on increasing the voice of youth in Europe's external politics and in representing Europe and European youth overseas.

== Current Activities ==
Young European Leadership aims to empower youth by providing them with high-level leadership development opportunities and to connect young people with decision-makers in the European Union and abroad. The organization recruits and trains young Europeans in leadership skills including public speaking and negotiation skills, and organizes a number of delegations and events to achieve this aim.

=== Y7 and Y20 Summits ===
The Youth Seven (Y7) and Youth Twenty (Y20) Summits – formerly G8 and G20 Youth Summits – are international youth conferences.

The Y7 and Y20 Summits are the official Group of Seven (G7) and Group of Twenty (G20) youth engagement groups. Young adults aged 18 to 30 are encouraged to provide innovative solutions to global challenges. Their proposals are then presented to the Heads of State of all G7 and G20 countries. YEL is the sole organization authorized to represent the European Union at these summits. As part of this process, the organization engages in extensive dissemination work of the Y7 and Y20 communiques, focusing on applying its findings across the EU and EU member states.

=== UNFCCC Delegations ===
Young European Leadership organizes a high-level youth delegation to the annual United Nations Climate Change conference. YEL sponsors 10 young Europeans to attend the annual UN COP Summit and trains them with the necessary know-how to make an impact on climate change. As part of their work, they also publish interviews with people of interest as it pertains to the summit. YEL is also accredited to the UNFCCC's annual Subsidiary Body (SB) conference in Bonn, Germany.

=== UN CSW Delegations ===
Young European Leadership organizes a high-level youth delegation to the annual UN Commission on the Status of Women conference. While YEL members have been involved in these summits in the past, the organization was accredited to the United Nations for this summit starting in 2025. YEL sponsors five young women from across Europe on an annual basis to give them the opportunity to attend the UN summit and to advocate for the voice and rights of women around the world.

=== Other Events ===
In addition, Young European Leadership (YEL) organizes and participates in various youth-focused events. These include events hosted by the European Business Summit, the OECD, the Paris Peace Forum, the Food and Agriculture Organization, the Misk Global Forum (MGF), the World Food Forum (WFF), the World Youth Development Forum (WYDF) in China, and the European Committee of the Regions. YEL also hosts its own annual summit to meet with youth from across Europe. The summit usually takes place in a different EU member state every year to allow YEL to better highlight the diversity of Europe.

== Former Activities ==
=== Young European Council ===
The Young European Council was a simulation of the European Council for young people. The different national positions on a variety of issues discussed at the European level such as energy, the question of the Euro or EU-bilateral relations, are covered. Young European Leadership organized the Young European Council (YEC) 2014 in Brussels. It gathered students and young professionals from all over Europe to address three challenges: education to employment, digital revolution and technologies, and sustainable development in cities; exchanging with policy-makers from the European institutions and think-tank experts. Guest speakers included the then-European Commissioner for Climate Action, Ms. Connie Hedegaard.

=== European Stars ===
Young European Leadership used to write and publishe the European Stars magazine twice a year. This magazine covered several topics in relation to European politics, including interviews, analysis on politics, and information from Y7, Y20, and COP delegates. It served as part of the organization's mission of information dissemination for youth politics in Europe. With the full transition to social media following the pandemic, the magazine was phased out in favor of a wider profile of website articles, a news room, and podcast series, and a larger presence on social media.

=== European Development Days ===
Young European Leadership has frequently sent a youth delegation to the European Development Days. The European Development Days are Europe's forum for international affairs and development cooperation. This initiative is sponsored by the European Commission and its premier goal is to consolidate the general view on development issues and create a unified approach to achieve more effective international cooperation.

=== YEL Society ===
The YEL Society was a project to bring together university students as well as young professionals involved in European and global politics. The Young European Leadership Society (YEL Society) believes that young people must be given the chance to design the world they are living in.

=== European Health Parliament Delegations ===
Young European Leadership organized high-level youth delegations to the European Health Parliament for a number of years, with the program being phased out in the mid-2020s.

== Organization ==
=== Board of Directors ===
- President & Chief Executive Officer: Augusto Gonzalez (Spain) (Argentina)
- Secretary General & Chief Operating Officer: Ana Opre (Romania)
- Treasurer & Chief Financial Officer : Maïa Madani Davies (United Kingdom) (France)

=== Executive Team ===
- Deputy CFO & Director of Finance: Panagiota Giannakopoulou (Greece)
- Director of Communications: Manray Davies (United Kingdom) (France)
- Director of Delegations: Alba Cantero Sanchez (United Kingdom) (Spain)
- Director of Operations: Nicole Rita Napoli (Italy)
- Director of Partnerships: Giovanni Chiacchio (Italy)

=== European and International Partners ===
==== European Partners ====
- Agora Center for Democracy
- DNK (Y20 Germany)
- European Guanxi
- Future Leaders Network
- Open Diplomacy Institute
- Paris Peace Forum
- Schneider Electric Foundation
- The New Global Order (TNGO)
- World Energy Council Italy
- Young Ambassadors Society (YAS)
- YPFP Brussels

==== International Partners ====
- African Union (Y20 AU)
- All-China Youth Federation
- Argentine Council on Foreign Relations (CARI)
- Brazilian Youth Council
- Foreign Ministry of Mexico (Y20 Mexico)
- Foreign Ministry of South Korea (Y20 South Korea)
- Indian Youth Diplomacy Forum (IYDF)
- Indonesia Youth Diplomacy (IYD)
- G7/G20 Youth Japan
- Global Voices
- Misk Foundation
- South African Youth for International Diplomacy
- Young Diplomats of Canada
- Young Professionals in Foreign Policy
- Youth Commission for Diplomacy and Collaboration (YCDC)

=== Notable alumni ===
- Tillmann Heidelk (Germany) , Co-Founder and First President of Young European Leadership (2013-2021)
- Eloïse Ryon (France) , Second President of Young European Leadership (2021-2025)
- Flóra Rétvalvi (Hungary) , Co-Founder and First Vice President of Young European Leadership
- Jeroen Stevens (Belgium) , Co-Founder and First Treasurer of Young European Leadership
- Diana Carter (United Kingdom) , Co-Founder and first Secretary-General and Treasurer
- Radoslav Šoth (Slovakia) , Co-Founder of YEL, Former EU Liaison Officer
- Josias Knöppler (Germany) , Former Treasurer and Vice President for Strategic Development
- Emma Wiesner (Sweden) , Member of the European Parliament (Renew Europe)
