= Hyzon Motors =

American automotive company

- Type: Public
- Traded as: Nasdaq: HYZN
- Industry: Automotive
- Founded: March 2020 (6 years ago) as spin off from Horizon Fuel Cell Technologies, founded in 2003 (23 years ago)
- Headquarters: Rochester, New York, United States
- Key people: Parker Meeks (CEO); Shinichi Hirano (CTO); Jiajia Wu (CFO); Bappa Banerjee (COO)
- Products: Hydrogen vehicle, heavy duty truck, Medium duty truck, bus, fuel cell systems
- Website: hyzonmotors.com

Hyzon Motors Inc. was an American automotive company based in Rochester, New York. Hyzon developed and manufactured hydrogen fuel cell systems and supplied zero-emission heavy-duty fuel cell electric vehicles. It had offices in the United States, the Netherlands, Australia, and China. Hyzon began being publicly traded through a SPAC merger in 2021, which was expected to raise about $626 million for the company. Hyzon delivered 87 fuel cell heavy trucks in 2021. Hyzon issued a notice in December 2024 that it is unable to continue its operations, and began dissolving the company. Horizon Fuel Cell Group has acquired the intellectual property of Hyzon Motors to resume serving Hyzon’s hydrogen vehicle customers and to strengthen its position in the global hydrogen heavy-duty truck market.

== Operations ==
Hyzon Motors was founded in 2020 as a spin-off of Singapore-based Horizon Fuel Cell Technologies, which was founded in 2003 with a focus on developing fuel-cell-powered trucks and buses.

In 2021, Hyzon Motors went public with a SPAC merger with Decarbonization Plus Acquisition Corporation.

In June 2022, Hyzon received its zero-emission certification from the California Air Resources Board for its Class 8, 7, and 6 Repowers. That same month Hyzon announced a collaboration with oil field services company Schlumberger Limited, aiming to reduce emissions in upstream oil and gas operations through the use of high-power fuel cells.

Parker Meeks was appointed President and interim CEO in August 2022, and CEO in March 2023.

In November 2023, Hyzon completed its first commercial journey to Texas with its liquid hydrogen truck. In June 2023, Hyzon partnered with Performance Food Group to deliver 5 fuel-cell electric vehicles fitted with Hyzon Class 8 110kW fuel cell systems. Additional vehicles will be fitted with Hyzon’s next-generation single 200kW fuel cell system.

Hyzon Montors launched in 2024 a hydrogen-powered garbage truck.

Hyzon issued a notice in December 2024 that it is unable to continue its operations, and began dissolving the company.

On 2025, Horizon Fuel Cell Technologies continues to develop hydrogen technologies and has recently acquired Hyzon's intellectual property to support its hydrogen vehicle customers.

== See also ==
- Hydrogen vehicle
- Fuel cell
- Hydrogen fuel
