= Neuman & Esser =

German manufacturing conglomerate

NEUMAN & ESSER
- Type: Private
- Industry: Mechanical engineering
- Founded: 1830; 196 years ago
- Founders: Johann Leonard Neuman; Friedrich August Neuman; Theodor Esser
- Headquarters: Übach-Palenberg, Germany
- Key people: Alexander Peters; Stefanie Peters; (Managing Partners)
- Products: Reciprocating compressors; Grinding and classifying systems; Packaging; After-market parts
- Services: Application engineering; Compressor service and repair
- Revenue: €467 million (2024)
- Number of employees: 1,800 (2026)
- Website: www.neuman-esser.com

NEUMAN & ESSER (NEA; Neumann & Esser in Aachen) was founded as a family establishment in Aachen, Germany in 1830. NEA is a manufacturer of reciprocating compressors, electrolyzers as well as mills and classifier systems for several industries, including oil and gas, chemical and petrochemical, food industry and renewable energy.

== History ==
NEUMAN & ESSER was founded as "J. L. Neuman & Cie. Maschinenfabrik" during the Industrial Revolution.

Brothers Johann Leonard Neuman and Friedrich August Neuman started the company "Gebrüder Neuman" in 1829, which was later renamed "J. L. Neuman & Cie. Maschinenfabrik" in 1830. This emergence founded the name of the company, known today as "NEUMAN & ESSER". Friedrich August Neuman also worked in boiler construction which still exists today in Eschweiler under the name "FA Neuman GmbH & Co. KG".

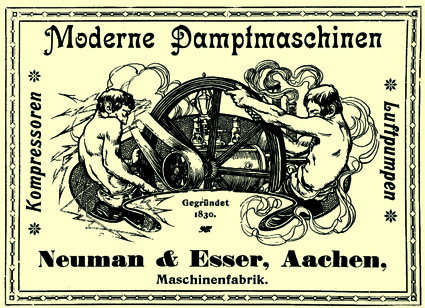
The first logo of Neuman & Esser

In the beginning, NEA produced hydraulic presses, decatizing rollers, reciprocating steam-powered engines and napping mills. Additionally, NEA serviced defective existing machines for customers. In 1888, the company moved into a new and larger production hall in Clasenstraße, near the Aachen West station. In the year 1891, Oscar Peters presided as the sole owner of the machinery factory. Since then, NEUMAN & ESSER has been owned by the Peters family.

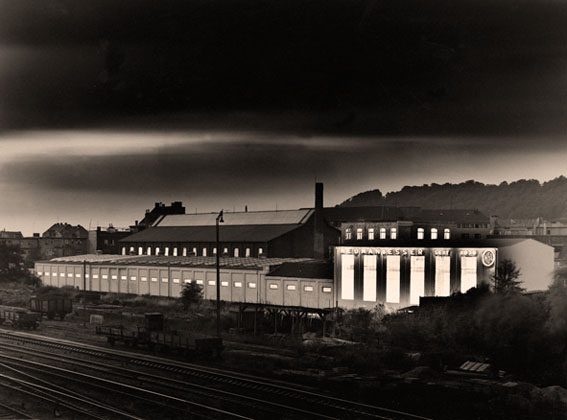
Production hall near the Aachen West railway station in the year 1888

In the early 1900s, NEA expanded its product portfolio to include piston steam engines, reciprocating compressors, vacuums, liquid pumps and drying systems. Later, in 1930–1931, crushing plants followed. NEUMAN & ESSER acquired the licenses for the construction of the Raymond pendulum roller mills from the insolvent company, Mehler. At the same time, NEA developed its first oil-free, dry-running compressor.

In 1972, NEUMAN & ESSER expanded its facilities to a new factory site in Übach-Palenberg, 20 km away from Aachen. Providing 250 local employee jobs at the time. As of 2026, about 1,800 employees work in 31 engineering and service companies in 16 countries and 4 production sites in Germany and one in the USA.

== Controversy ==
In 2017, NEUMAN & ESSER faced strong public criticism after an executive employee reported a Scottish man to the Dubai authorities for accidentally touching his hip in a crowded Dubai bar. The employee later retracted the accusation; however, NEA released a statement supporting the case against the Scotsman, who was subsequently sentenced to three months in prison. One day after the Scottish man was sentenced, it was announced that Dubai's ruler, Sheikh Mohammed bin Rashid al-Maktoum, ordered Harron to be released.

== Divisions ==
NEUMAN & ESSER includes divisions in sales and application centers for reciprocating compressors and grinding and classifying systems, compressor aftermarket spare parts and repair service centers, as well as its holdings.

=== Reciprocating compressors ===
Reciprocating compressors, also called piston compressors, from NEA compress air and technical gases. Oil-free and lubricated reciprocating compressors are produced in Leipzig. The larger compressors are manufactured in Übach-Palenberg, and the smaller ones are built in Wurzen. The core competence in the production of compressors has also been expanded through the acquisition of Stasskol, a manufacturer of piston rings and sealing systems.

=== Grinding and classifying systems ===
NEUMAN & ESSER has built grinding systems since 1930. The first product was the pendulum roller mill. In 1994, NEA introduced its own impact classifier mill to the market, and in 1998, the company received the patent. NEA mills are used for applications within the ceramic and chemical industries, including pigment production and processing technologies. In recent years, the areas of powder coating production, confectionery and the food industries have followed.

=== Aftermarket ===
In addition to the production of compressors and grinding systems, NEUMAN & ESSER offers service. Founded in 1983, NEA separated from customer service in 1988 as NEAC Compressor Service, an independent enterprise. During the first 10 years, NEAC was a joint venture with Atlas Copco. The global sales network enabled them to move directly into international business.

NEAC is the service organization for all piston compressor products of the NEUMAN & ESSER GROUP. Moreover, NEA has access to all original order documents and original drawings of the compressor brands Linde, Esslinger / GHH, Demag, Mafa Wurzen, Chicago Pneumatic, Halberg, KSB (Erhardt & Sehmer) and PPC (PENN Process Compressors). NEUMAN & ESSER acquired from MAN Turbo the entire division of After-Sales Service for Borsig-Berlin piston compressors built in Berlin up to the end of 1995. From 2018 to 2021, NEAC Compressor Service and Peter Brotherhood (PB) have partnered to provide service for PB's installed API 618 piston compressors.

== Locations ==
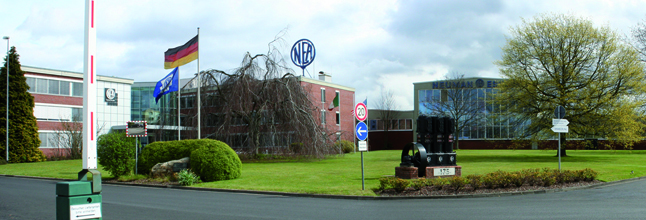
Neuman & Esser headquarters in Übach-Palenberg

=== Germany ===
- Übach-Palenberg (headquarters)
- Wurzen
- Mülheim an der Ruhr
- Stassfurt (Company name STASSKOL)
- Holzwickede
- Aachen
- Velbert

=== Worldwide ===
- United States: Katy (Texas)
- China: Beijing, Kunshan
- Brazil: Belo Horizonte, Campinas
- Italy: Milan
- India: Pune
- United Arabic Emirates: Dubai
- Egypt: Cairo
- Thailand: Rayong
- Korea: Changwon
- Libya: Tripoli
- Australia: Melbourne
- Turkiye: Istanbul
- Kazakhstan: Astana
