= Airlift (disambiguation) =

Airlift is the act of transporting people or cargo from point to point using aircraft.

Airlift may also refer to:

- Airlift (company), a Norwegian helicopter operator
- Airlift (dredging device), a suction device for moving sand and silt underwater
- Airlift (film), a 2016 film about the evacuation of Indians based in Kuwait, starring Akshay Kumar and Nimrat Kaur
- Lift (force), the upwards force generated resulting from the pressure difference when air moves over an airfoil.

== See also ==
- Airlift pump, a way of pumping a liquid with the injection of compressed air
