= Pulser pump =

Gas lift device for pumping water

- Pulser pump
- Uses: Irrigation; Airation; Suction
- Inventor: Charles H. Taylor (1910)
- Related items: Trompe; Aspirator; Injector

A pulser pump is a gas lift device that uses gravity to pump water to a higher elevation. It has no moving parts.

== Operation ==
A pulser pump makes use of water that flows through pipes and an air chamber from an upper reservoir to a lower reservoir. The intake is a trompe, which uses water flow to pump air to a separation chamber; air trapped in the chamber then drives an airlift pump. The top of the pipe that connects the upper reservoir to the air chamber is positioned just below the water surface. As the water drops down the pipe, air is sucked down with it. The air forms a "bubble" near the roof of the air chamber. A narrow riser pipe extends from the air chamber up to the higher elevation to which the water will be pumped.

Initially the water level will be near the roof of the air chamber. As air accumulates, pressure builds, which will push water up into the riser pipe. At some point the "air bubble" will extend below the bottom of the riser pipe, which will allow some of the air to escape through the riser, pushing the water that is already in the pipe up with it. As the air escapes, the water level in the air chamber will rise again. The alternating pressure build up and escape causes a pulsing effect, hence the name: pulser pump.

The maximum air pressure that can accumulate depends on the height of the water column between the air chamber and the lower reservoir. The deeper the air chamber is positioned, the higher the elevation to which the water can be pumped. The depth of the air chamber position is limited by the depth to which the flowing water can pull the air from the surface of the upper reservoir down to the chamber. This depth partially depends on the speed of the water, which in turn depends on the difference in height between the upper and lower reservoir.

== History ==
The earliest known description of a device that has later been interpreted as analogous to a pulser pump dates to 1764, when the Spanish priest Juan Velázquez de Echeverría, in Paseos por Granada y sus contornos, ó Descripción de sus antiguedades y monumentos (transl. Wanderings through Granada and its surroundings, or a description of its antiquities and monuments) described a hydraulic water-lifting mechanism observed at the Alhambra in Granada. Written in non-technical terms, the account refers to a system capable of raising water without conventional mechanical machinery, though its exact mode of operation was not clearly explained. Due to the absence of surviving physical remains or detailed contemporary schematics, the precise nature of the device remains uncertain, and its identification as a pulser-type pump is based on later historical and engineering interpretation.

In the early twentieth century, the Spanish engineer Toribio Cáceres re-examined Velázquez de Echeverría's eighteenth-century description and proposed that the mechanism was functionally equivalent to a hydraulic ram or pulser pump. Cáceres presented an experimental reconstruction of the system in 1911, suggesting that intermittent pressure surges within a closed conduit could account for the observed water elevation.

== See also ==
- Airlift pump
- Hydraulic ram
