= Refrigeration =

Process of moving heat from one location to another in controlled conditions

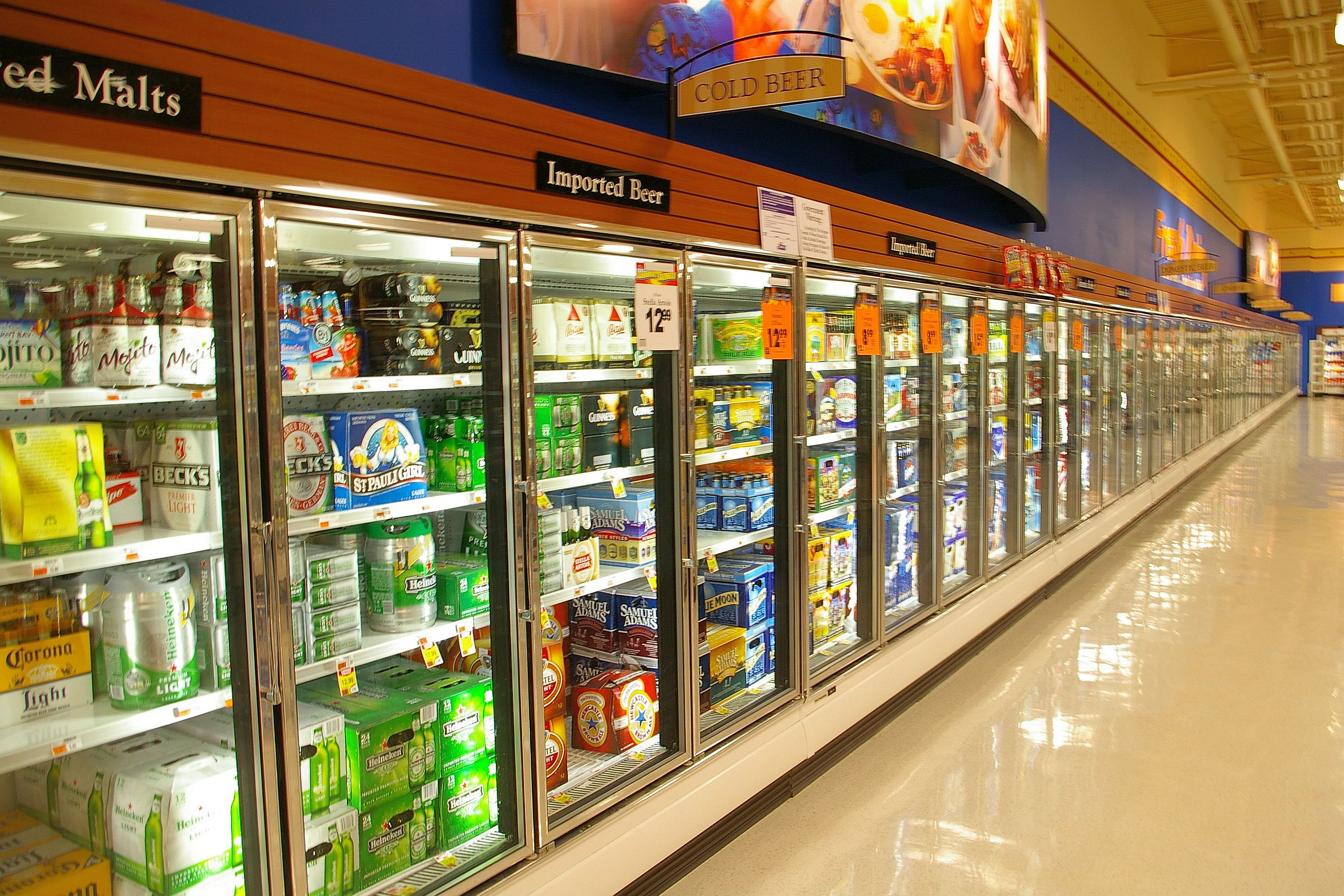
Commercial refrigeration

Refrigeration is the artificial cooling of a space, substance, or system to lower and/or maintain its temperature below the ambient temperature. Early refrigeration used consumable coolants such as ice and dry ice (which are procured through separate means and need periodic replenishing), while modern refrigeration is a self-sustaining heat exchanger process by which thermal energy is transferred against the temperature gradient via the use of a heat-transfer working fluid (also known as refrigerant), which absorbs heat from a low-temperature medium and releases it to another higher-temperature medium, typically involving active phase change via a compressor and aided by a radiator system. Energy transfer in refrigeration is traditionally driven by physical means (whether ice melting or an electromechanical machine driving the heat exchanger), but it can also be driven by heat pump, magnetism, electricity, laser cooling, or other means. Refrigeration has many applications, including household refrigerators, industrial freezers, cryogenics, and cool store air conditioning. Heat pumps may make use of the heat output of the refrigeration process (such as for water heating), and also may be designed to be reversible, but are otherwise similar to air conditioning units.

Refrigeration has had a large impact on human lifestyle, agriculture, industry and settlement patterns. The idea of preserving foods by cold storage dates back to human prehistory, but for thousands of years human societies were limited regarding the means of doing so. In tropical and most temperate regions, surplus foods were typically preserved using curing (often by salting) and drying, while means of cold food storage were generally unavailable unless in arctic, subarctic or alpine regions where humans can conveniently harvest natural ice (from glaciers or frozen waterbodies) and/or made use of natural coolness in caves, root cellars and winter weather. In the 19th century, the rise of ice trade enabled the development of cold chains. In the late 19th through mid-20th centuries, mechanical refrigeration was invented, improved and greatly expanded in its reach, and refrigeration has thus rapidly evolved in the forms of temperature-controlled rail cars, refrigerator trucks and the ubiquitous white goods refrigerators and freezers in both stores and average homes in most countries. The introduction of refrigerated rail cars also contributed to the settlement of areas that were not on earlier main transport channels such as rivers, harbors, or valley trails, and sparked the building of large cities which are able to thrive in areas that were otherwise thought to be inhospitable due to hot climate, such as Houston, Texas, and Las Vegas, Nevada.

In most developed countries today, cities and towns are heavily dependent upon refrigeration in the food processing, distribution and retail industries (such as supermarkets and butcher shops) to maintain food safety for daily consumption. The improvement in food preservation due to refrigeration, which significantly reduced food loss and waste due to spoilage, has also led to a new supply chain infrastructure where large quantities of meat, seafood and produce can be supplied from a smaller number of farms and fisheries, both of which now output a much larger food yield per capita in comparison to the late 1800s. This has also resulted in more diversification of food products (such as rare delicacies) available to the consumer market, which has had a large impact on the nutrition, tastes and culinary arts of modern societies.

== History ==
=== Earliest forms of cooling ===
The seasonal harvesting of snow and ice is an ancient practice estimated to have begun earlier than 1000 BC. A Chinese collection of lyrics from this time period known as the Shijing, describes religious ceremonies for filling and emptying ice cellars. However, little is known about the construction of these ice cellars or the purpose of the ice. Tang dynasty (618 AD) used saltpetre scraped from walls to produce ice in summer. The next ancient society to record the harvesting of ice may have been the Jews in the book of Proverbs, which reads, "As the cold of snow in the time of harvest, so is a faithful messenger to them who sent him." Historians have interpreted this to mean that the Jews used ice to cool beverages rather than to preserve food. Other ancient cultures such as the Greeks and the Romans dug large snow pits insulated with grass, chaff, or branches of trees as cold storage. Like the Jews, the Greeks and Romans did not use ice and snow to preserve food, but primarily as a means to cool beverages. Egyptians cooled water by evaporation in shallow earthen jars on the roofs of their houses at night. The ancient people of India used this same concept to produce ice. The Persians stored ice in a pit called a Yakhchal and may have been the first group of people to use cold storage to preserve food. In the Australian outback before a reliable electricity supply was available many farmers used a Coolgardie safe, consisting of a box frame with hessian (burlap) sides soaked in water. The water would evaporate and thereby cool the interior air, allowing many perishables such as fruit, butter, and cured meats to be kept.

=== Ice harvesting ===
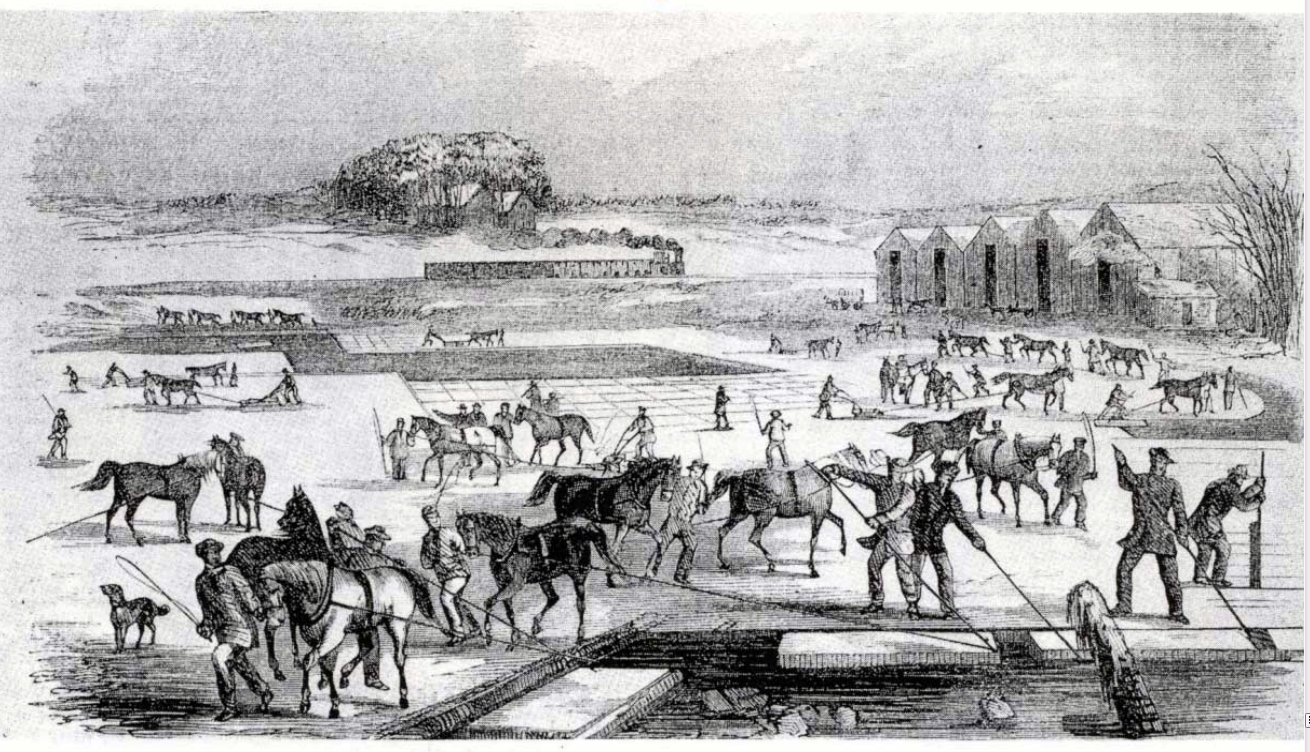
Ice harvesting in Massachusetts, 1852, showing the railroad line in the background, used to transport the ice.

Before 1830, few Americans used ice to refrigerate foods due to a lack of ice-storehouses and iceboxes. As these two things became more widely available, individuals used axes and saws to harvest ice for their storehouses. This method proved to be difficult, dangerous, and certainly did not resemble anything that could be duplicated on a commercial scale.

Despite the difficulties of harvesting ice, Frederic Tudor thought that he could capitalize on this new commodity by harvesting ice in New England and shipping it to the Caribbean islands as well as the southern states. In the beginning, Tudor lost thousands of dollars, but eventually turned a profit as he constructed icehouses in Charleston, Virginia and in the Cuban port town of Havana. These icehouses as well as better insulated ships helped reduce ice wastage from 66% to 8%. This efficiency gain influenced Tudor to expand his ice market to other towns with icehouses such as New Orleans and Savannah. This ice market further expanded as harvesting ice became faster and cheaper after one of Tudor's suppliers, Nathaniel Wyeth, invented a horse-drawn ice cutter in 1825. This invention as well as Tudor's success inspired others to get involved in the ice trade and the ice industry grew.

Ice became a mass-market commodity by the early 1830s with the price of ice dropping from six cents per pound to a half cent per pound. In New York City, ice consumption increased from 12,000 tons in 1843 to 100,000 tons in 1856. Boston's consumption leapt from 6,000 tons to 85,000 tons during that same period. Ice harvesting created a "cooling culture" as the majority of people used ice and iceboxes to store their dairy products, fish, meat, and even fruits and vegetables. These early cold storage practices paved the way for many Americans to accept the refrigeration technology that would soon take over the country.

=== Refrigeration research ===
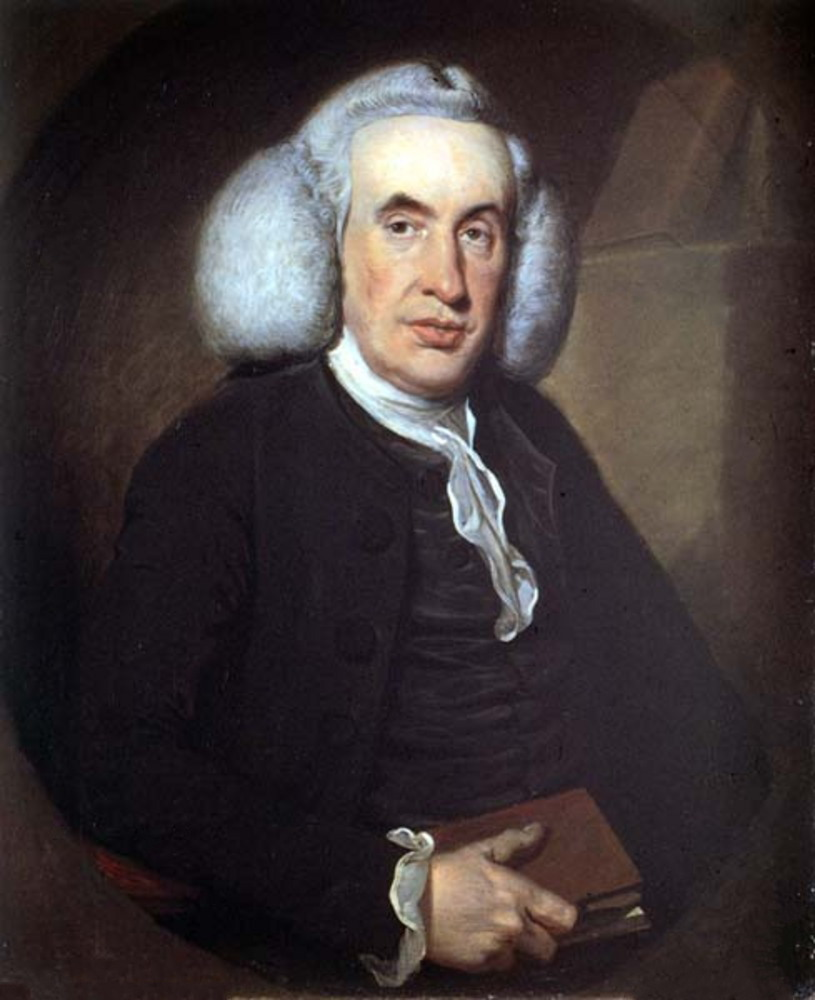
William Cullen, the first to conduct experiments into artificial refrigeration.

The history of artificial refrigeration began when William Cullen designed a small refrigerating machine in 1755. Cullen used a pump to create a partial vacuum over a container of diethyl ether, which then boiled, absorbing heat from the surrounding air. The experiment even created a small amount of ice, but had no practical application at that time.

In 1758, Benjamin Franklin and chemist John Hadley collaborated on a project investigating the principle of evaporation as a means to rapidly cool an object at Cambridge University, England. They confirmed that the evaporation of highly volatile liquids, such as alcohol and ether, could be used to drive down the temperature of an object past the freezing point of water. They conducted their experiment with the bulb of a mercury thermometer as their object and with a bellows used to quicken the evaporation; they lowered the temperature of the thermometer bulb down to −14 °C (7 °F), while the ambient temperature was 18 °C (65 °F). They noted that soon after they passed the freezing point of water 0 °C (32 °F), a thin film of ice formed on the surface of the thermometer's bulb and that the ice mass was about a 6.4 millimetres (1/4 in) thick when they stopped the experiment upon reaching −14 °C (7 °F). Franklin wrote, "From this experiment, one may see the possibility of freezing a man to death on a warm summer's day". In 1805, American inventor Oliver Evans described a closed vapor-compression refrigeration cycle for the production of ice by ether under vacuum.

In 1820, Michael Faraday liquefied ammonia and other gases by using high pressures and low temperatures, and in 1834, Jacob Perkins built the first working vapor-compression refrigeration system in the world. It was a closed-cycle that could operate continuously, as he described in his patent, "I am enabled to use volatile fluids for the purpose of producing the cooling or freezing of fluids, and yet at the same time constantly condensing such volatile fluids, and bringing them again into operation without waste." His prototype system worked although it did not succeed commercially.

In 1842, a similar attempt was made by physician John Gorrie, who built a working prototype, but it was a commercial failure. Like many of the medical experts during this time, Gorrie thought too much exposure to tropical heat led to mental and physical degeneration, as well as the spread of diseases such as malaria. He conceived the idea of using his refrigeration system to cool the air for comfort in homes and hospitals to prevent disease. American engineer Alexander Twining took out a British patent in 1850 for a vapour compression system that used ether.

The first practical vapour-compression refrigeration system was built by the journalist James Harrison. His 1856 patent was for a vapour-compression system using ether, alcohol, or ammonia. He built a mechanical ice-making machine in 1851 on the banks of the Barwon River at Rocky Point in Geelong, Victoria, and his first commercial ice-making machine followed in 1854. Harrison also introduced commercial vapour-compression refrigeration to breweries and meat-packing houses, and by 1861, a dozen of his systems were in operation. He later entered the debate of how to compete against the American advantage of unrefrigerated beef sales to the United Kingdom. In 1873 he prepared the sailing ship Norfolk for an experimental beef shipment to the United Kingdom, which used a cold room system instead of a refrigeration system. The venture was a failure as the ice was consumed faster than expected.

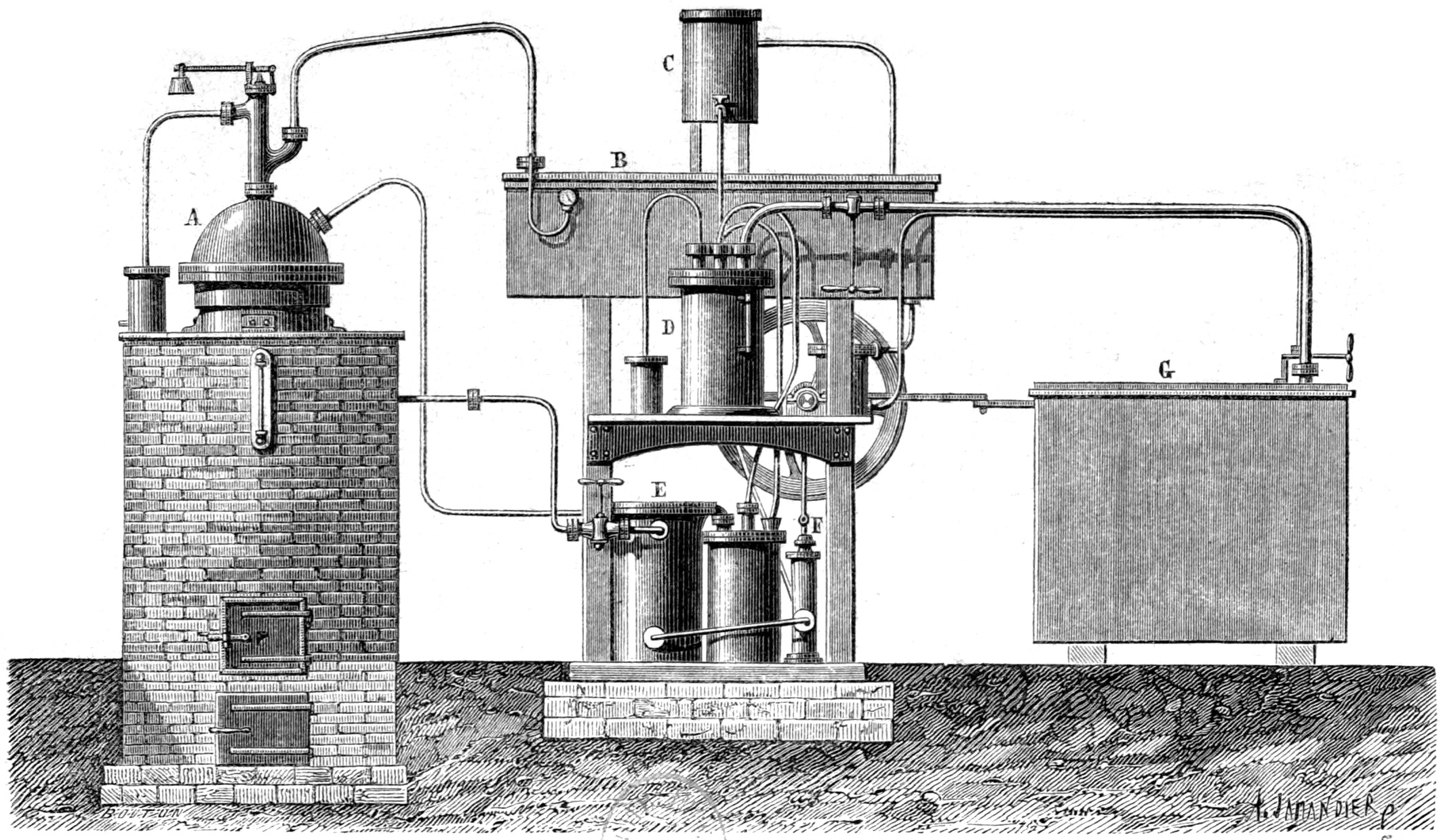
Ferdinand Carré's ice-making device

The first gas absorption refrigeration system using gaseous ammonia dissolved in water (referred to as "aqua ammonia") was developed by Ferdinand Carré in 1859 and patented in 1860. Carl von Linde, an engineer specializing in steam locomotives and professor of engineering at the Technical University of Munich, began researching refrigeration in the 1860s and 1870s in response to demand from brewers for a technology that would allow year-round, large-scale production of lager; he patented an improved method of liquefying gases in 1876. His new process made possible using gases such as ammonia, sulfur dioxide (SO_{2}) and methyl chloride (CH_{3}Cl) as refrigerants and they were widely used for that purpose until the late 1920s.

Thaddeus Lowe, a balloonist, held several patents on ice-making machines. In 1869, he and other investors purchased an old steamship onto which they loaded one of Lowe's refrigeration units and began shipping fresh fruit from New York to the Gulf Coast area, and fresh meat from Galveston, Texas back to New York, but because of Lowe's lack of knowledge about shipping, the business was a costly failure.

=== Commercial use ===
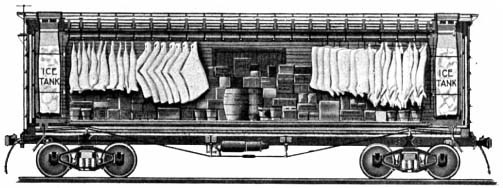
An 1870 refrigerator car design. Hatches in the roof provided access to the tanks for the storage of harvested ice at each end.

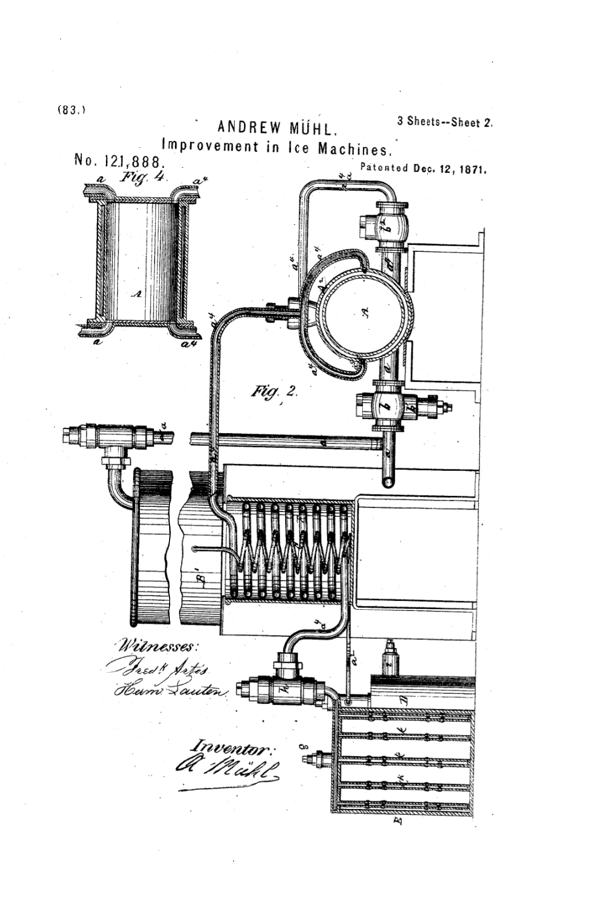
Icemaker Patent by Andrew Muhl, dated December 12, 1871.

In 1842, John Gorrie created a system capable of refrigerating water to produce ice. Although it was a commercial failure, it inspired scientists and inventors around the world. France's Ferdinand Carre was one of the inspired and he created an ice producing system that was simpler and smaller than that of Gorrie. During the Civil War, cities such as New Orleans could no longer get ice from New England via the coastal ice trade. Carre's refrigeration system became the solution to New Orleans' ice problems and, by 1865, the city had three of Carre's machines. In 1867, in San Antonio, Texas, a French immigrant named Andrew Muhl built an ice-making machine to help service the expanding beef industry before moving it to Waco in 1871. In 1873, the patent for this machine was contracted by the Columbus Iron Works, a company acquired by the W.C. Bradley Co., which went on to produce the first commercial ice-makers in the United States.

By the 1870s, breweries had become the largest users of harvested ice. Though the ice-harvesting industry had grown immensely by the turn of the 20th century, pollution and sewage had begun to creep into natural ice, making it a problem in the metropolitan suburbs. Eventually, breweries began to complain of tainted ice. Public concern for the purity of water, from which ice was formed, began to increase in the early 1900s with the rise of germ theory. Numerous media outlets published articles connecting diseases such as typhoid fever with natural ice consumption. This caused ice harvesting to become illegal in certain areas of the country. All of these scenarios increased the demands for modern refrigeration and manufactured ice. Ice producing machines like that of Carre's and Muhl's were looked to as means of producing ice to meet the needs of grocers, farmers, and food shippers.

Refrigerated railroad cars were introduced in the US in the 1840s for short-run transport of dairy products, but these used harvested ice to maintain a cool temperature.

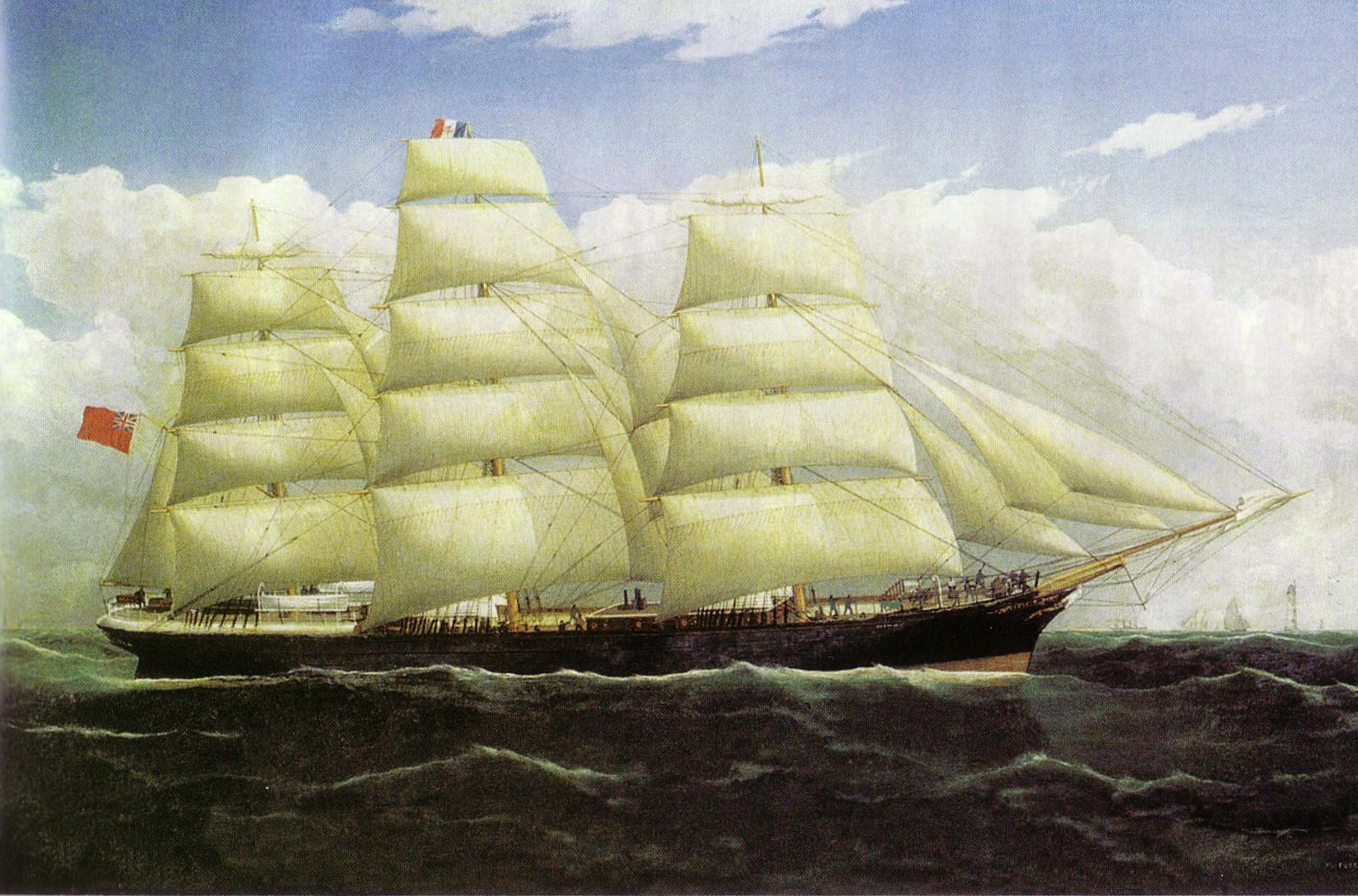
Dunedin, the first commercially successful refrigerated ship.

The new refrigerating technology first met with widespread industrial use as a means to freeze meat supplies for transport by sea in reefer ships from the British Dominions and other countries to the British Isles. Although not actually the first to achieve successful transportation of frozen goods overseas (the Strathleven had arrived at the London docks on 2 February 1880 with a cargo of frozen beef, mutton and butter from Sydney and Melbourne), the breakthrough is often attributed to William Soltau Davidson, an entrepreneur who had emigrated to New Zealand. Davidson thought that Britain's rising population and meat demand could mitigate the slump in world wool markets that was heavily affecting New Zealand. After extensive research, he commissioned the Dunedin to be refitted with a compression refrigeration unit for meat shipment in 1881. On February 15, 1882, the Dunedin sailed for London with what was to be the first commercially successful refrigerated shipping voyage, and the foundation of the refrigerated meat industry.

The Times commented "Today we have to record such a triumph over physical difficulties, as would have been incredible, even unimaginable, a very few days ago ...". The Marlborough — sister ship to the Dunedin — was immediately converted and joined the trade the following year, along with the rival New Zealand Shipping Company vessel Mataurua, while the German Steamer Marsala began carrying frozen New Zealand lamb in December 1882. Within five years, 172 shipments of frozen meat were sent from New Zealand to the United Kingdom, of which only 9 had significant amounts of meat condemned. Refrigerated shipping also led to a broader meat and dairy boom in Australasia and South America. J & E Hall of Dartford, England outfitted the SS Selembria with a vapor compression system to bring 30,000 carcasses of mutton from the Falkland Islands in 1886. In the years ahead, the industry rapidly expanded to Australia, Argentina and the United States.

By the 1890s, refrigeration played a vital role in the distribution of food. The meat-packing industry relied heavily on natural ice in the 1880s and continued to rely on manufactured ice as those technologies became available. By 1900, the meat-packing houses of Chicago had adopted ammonia-cycle commercial refrigeration. By 1914, almost every location used artificial refrigeration. The major meat packers, Armour, Swift, and Wilson, had purchased the most expensive units which they installed on train cars and in branch houses and storage facilities in the more remote distribution areas.

By the middle of the 20th century, refrigeration units were designed for installation on trucks or lorries. Refrigerated vehicles are used to transport perishable goods, such as frozen foods, fruit and vegetables, and temperature-sensitive chemicals. Most modern refrigerators keep the temperature between –40 and –20 °C, and have a maximum payload of around 24,000 kg gross weight (in Europe).

Although commercial refrigeration quickly progressed, it had limitations that prevented it from moving into the household. First, most refrigerators were far too large. Some of the commercial units being used in 1910 weighed between five and two hundred tons. Second, commercial refrigerators were expensive to produce, purchase, and maintain. Lastly, these refrigerators were unsafe. It was not uncommon for commercial refrigerators to catch fire, explode, or leak toxic gases. Refrigeration did not become a household technology until these three challenges were overcome.

=== Home and consumer use ===
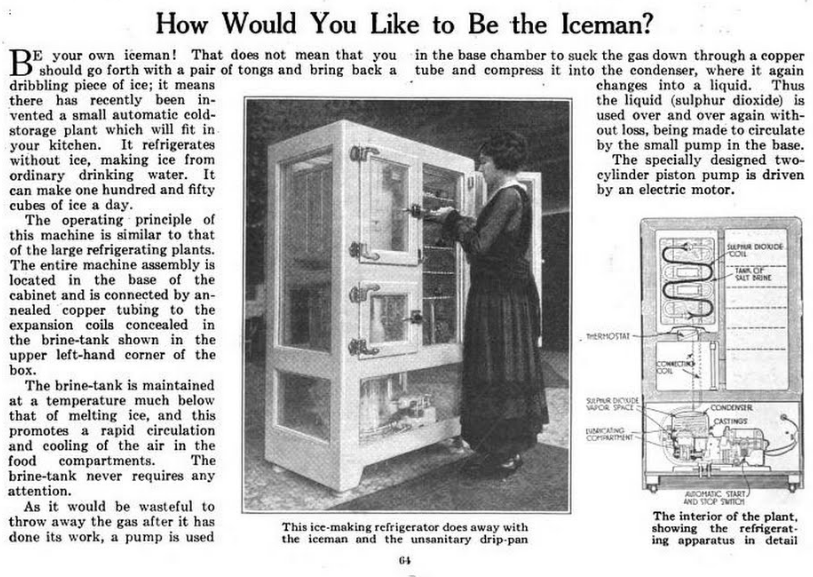
An early example of the consumerization of mechanical refrigeration that began in the early 20th century. The refrigerant was sulfur dioxide.

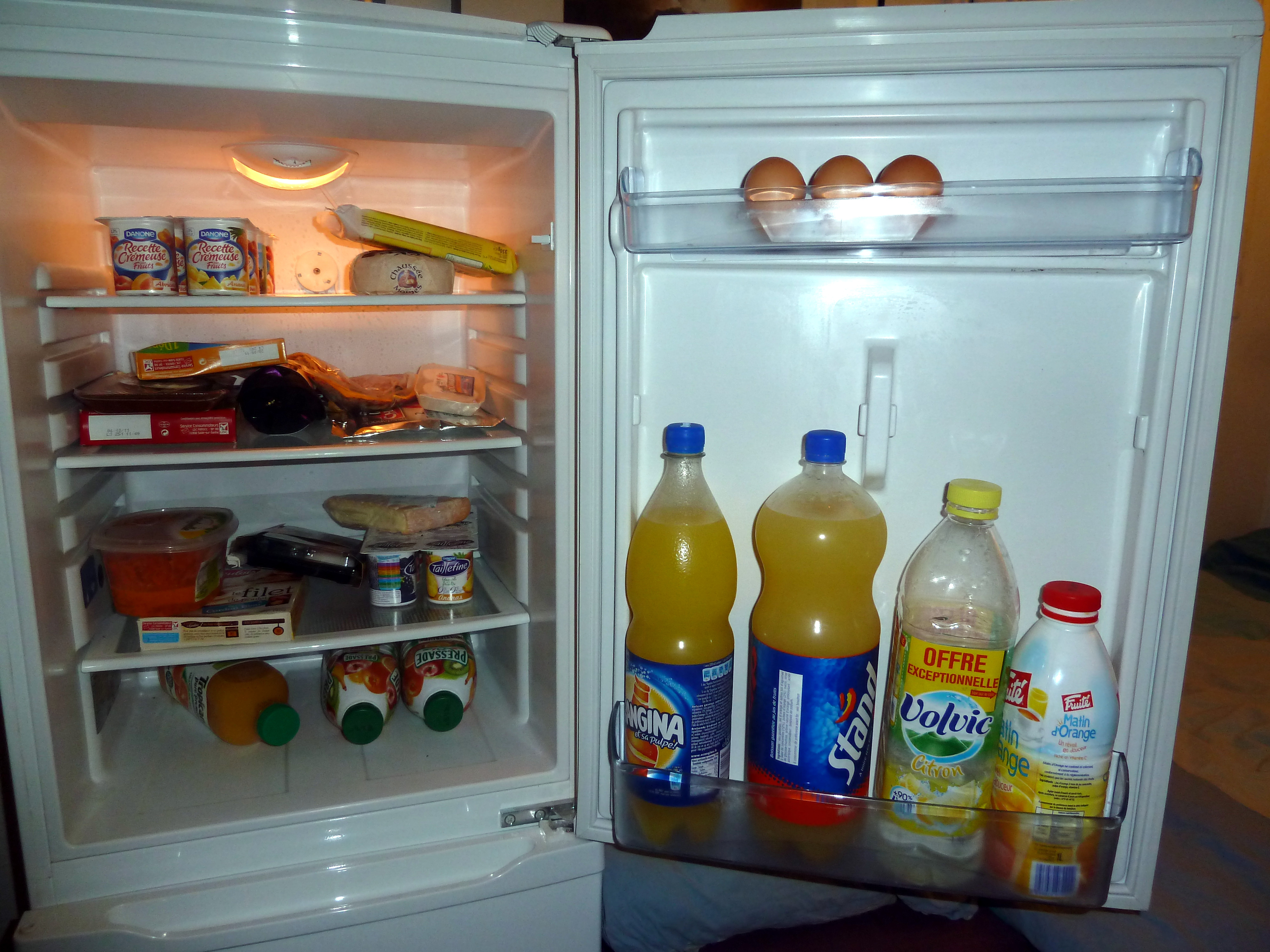
A modern home refrigerator

During the early 1800s, consumers preserved their food by storing food and ice purchased from ice harvesters in iceboxes. In 1803, Thomas Moore patented a metal-lined butter-storage tub which became the prototype for most iceboxes. These iceboxes were used until nearly 1910 and the technology did not progress. In fact, consumers that used the icebox in 1910 faced the same challenge of a moldy and stinky icebox that consumers had in the early 1800s.

General Electric (GE) was one of the first companies to overcome these challenges. In 1911, GE released a household refrigeration unit that was powered by gas. The use of gas eliminated the need for an electric compressor motor and decreased the size of the refrigerator. However, electric companies that were customers of GE did not benefit from a gas-powered unit. Thus, GE invested in developing an electric model. In 1927, GE released the Monitor Top, the first refrigerator to run on electricity.

In 1930, Frigidaire, one of GE's main competitors, synthesized Freon. With the invention of synthetic refrigerants based mostly on a chlorofluorocarbon (CFC) chemical, safer refrigerators were possible for home and consumer use. Freon led to the development of smaller, lighter, and cheaper refrigerators. The average price of a refrigerator dropped from $275 to $154 with the synthesis of Freon. This lower price allowed ownership of refrigerators in American households to exceed 50% by 1940. Freon is a trademark of the DuPont Corporation and refers to these CFCs, and later hydro chlorofluorocarbon (HCFC) and hydro fluorocarbon (HFC), refrigerants developed in the late 1920s. These refrigerants were considered — at the time — to be less harmful than the commonly used refrigerants of the time, including methyl formate, ammonia, methyl chloride, and sulfur dioxide. The intent was to provide refrigeration equipment for home use without danger. These CFC refrigerants answered that need. In the 1970s, though, the compounds were found to be reacting with atmospheric ozone, an important protection against solar ultraviolet radiation, and their use as a refrigerant worldwide was curtailed in the Montreal Protocol of 1987.

== Impact on settlement patterns in the United States of America ==
The development of refrigerated transportation changed the geography of food production and distribution in the United States by allowing perishable agricultural products to be transported over greater distances. This contributed to the development of agricultural regions farther from major eastern markets and established transport routes.

=== Refrigerated rail cars ===
The refrigerated rail car, together with the expanding railroad network, enabled meat and agricultural products to be transported between producing regions and distant urban markets. In the late nineteenth century, refrigerated rail transportation became particularly important to the meat-packing industry and subsequently to growers and distributors of fruits and vegetables.

The meat-packing industry was an important early user of refrigerated rail cars. Railroads were initially reluctant to adopt the cars because of existing investments in cattle cars, stockyards and related infrastructure, while refrigerated cars were more complex and expensive than ordinary freight cars. Meat-packing companies developed refrigerated transportation and cold-storage networks that were later also used for other perishable foods.

During World War I, a national refrigerator-car pool was established to improve the utilization of cars that otherwise could remain idle between seasonal harvests. Refrigerator cars could be redirected as crops matured in different regions. They carried produce eastward from western vineyards, orchards and agricultural districts to distant consumer markets.

Refrigerated rail transportation helped make regional specialization in perishable agricultural products economically practical by increasing the distance over which such products could be marketed. Rail remained important for refrigerated freight into the mid-twentieth century, but the expansion of highway trucking increasingly shifted perishable freight away from rail.

=== Expansion west and into rural areas ===
Refrigerated transportation expanded markets for agricultural regions in the South and West by allowing producers to sell perishable goods farther from where they were grown. California became an important producer and shipper of fruits including grapes, peaches, pears, plums and apples, while other regions developed specialized production of crops such as peaches, strawberries, tomatoes and cantaloupes.

In California, shipments using refrigerated rail cars increased from about 4,500 carloads in 1895 to between 8,000 and 10,000 carloads in 1905. By 1917, established fruit- and vegetable-producing regions nearer eastern markets faced increased competition from more distant specialized production centres.

Refrigeration also expanded the geographic range of dairy production and distribution. By the early twentieth century, some large cities obtained dairy products from farms as far as 640 kilometres (400 mi) away. Refrigeration allowed western dairy producers located far from eastern markets to compete despite transportation costs. More broadly, refrigerated transportation reduced some of the disadvantages faced by productive agricultural areas located away from traditional transport routes and major population centres.

=== Rise of the galactic city ===
The term "galactic city", associated with Lewis Mumford, describes a dispersed form of metropolitan development. Twentieth-century urban growth in parts of the United States was supported by several infrastructure and technological changes, including highway transportation, air conditioning, expanded agricultural production and systems for transporting and storing food over long distances.

Refrigeration contributed to this broader infrastructure by allowing urban populations to obtain perishable food from distant agricultural regions rather than depending primarily on nearby production. In analyses of settlement patterns, refrigeration has therefore been identified as one of several technologies that reduced constraints on population growth in locations distant from traditional agricultural and transport centres.

== Impact on agriculture and food production ==
Agriculture's role in developed countries has drastically changed in the last century due to many factors, including refrigeration. Statistics from the 2007 census gives information on the large concentration of agricultural sales coming from a small portion of the existing farms in the United States today. This is a partial result of the market created for the frozen meat trade by the first successful shipment of frozen sheep carcasses coming from New Zealand in the 1880s. As the market continued to grow, regulations on food processing and quality began to be enforced. Eventually, electricity was introduced into rural homes in the United States, which allowed refrigeration technology to continue to expand on the farm, increasing output per person. Today, refrigeration's use on the farm reduces humidity levels, avoids spoiling due to bacterial growth, and assists in preservation.

=== Demographics ===
The introduction of refrigeration and evolution of additional technologies drastically changed agriculture in the United States. During the beginning of the 20th century, farming was a common occupation and lifestyle for United States citizens, as most farmers actually lived on their farm. In 1935, there were 6.8 million farms in the United States and a population of 127 million. Yet, while the United States population has continued to climb, citizens pursuing agriculture continue to decline. Based on the 2007 US Census, less than one percent of a population of 310 million people claim farming as an occupation today. However, the increasing population has led to an increasing demand for agricultural products, which is met through a greater variety of crops, fertilizers, pesticides, and improved technology. Improved technology has decreased the risk and time involved for agricultural management and allows larger farms to increase their output per person to meet society's demand.

=== Meat packing and trade ===
Prior to 1882, the South Island of New Zealand had been experimenting with sowing grass and crossbreeding sheep, which immediately gave their farmers economic potential in the exportation of meat. In 1882, the first successful shipment of sheep carcasses was sent from Port Chalmers in Dunedin, New Zealand, to London. By the 1890s, the frozen meat trade became increasingly more profitable in New Zealand, especially in Canterbury, where 50% of exported sheep carcasses came from in 1900. It was not long before Canterbury meat was known for the highest quality, creating a demand for New Zealand meat around the world. In order to meet this new demand, the farmers improved their feed so sheep could be ready for the slaughter in only seven months. This new method of shipping led to an economic boom in New Zealand by the mid 1890s.

In the United States, the Meat Inspection Act of 1891 was put in place in the United States because local butchers felt the refrigerated railcar system was unwholesome. When meat packing began to take off, consumers became nervous about the quality of the meat for consumption. Upton Sinclair's 1906 novel The Jungle brought negative attention to the meat packing industry, by drawing to light unsanitary working conditions and processing of diseased animals. The book caught the attention of President Theodore Roosevelt, and the 1906 Meat Inspection Act was put into place as an amendment to the Meat Inspection Act of 1891. This new act focused on the quality of the meat and environment it is processed in.

=== Electricity in rural areas ===
In the early 1930s, 90 percent of the urban population of the United States had electric power, in comparison to only 10 percent of rural homes. At the time, power companies did not feel that extending power to rural areas (rural electrification) would produce enough profit to make it worth their while. However, in the midst of the Great Depression, President Franklin D. Roosevelt realized that rural areas would continue to lag behind urban areas in both poverty and production if they were not electrically wired. On May 11, 1935, the president signed an executive order called the Rural Electrification Administration, also known as REA. The agency provided loans to fund electric infrastructure in the rural areas. In just a few years, 300,000 people in rural areas of the United States had received power in their homes.

While electricity dramatically improved working conditions on farms, it also had a large impact on the safety of food production. Refrigeration systems were introduced to the farming and food distribution processes, which helped in food preservation and kept food supplies safe. Refrigeration also allowed for shipment of perishable commodities throughout the United States. As a result, United States farmers quickly became the most productive in the world, and entire new food systems arose.

=== Farm use ===
In order to reduce humidity levels and spoiling due to bacterial growth, refrigeration is used for meat, produce, and dairy processing in farming today. Refrigeration systems are used the heaviest in the warmer months for farming produce, which must be cooled as soon as possible in order to meet quality standards and increase the shelf life. Meanwhile, dairy farms refrigerate milk year round to avoid spoiling.

== Effects on lifestyle and diet ==
In the late 19th Century and into the very early 20th Century, except for staple foods (sugar, rice, and beans) that needed no refrigeration, the available foods were affected heavily by the seasons and what could be grown locally. Refrigeration has removed these limitations. Refrigeration played a large part in the feasibility and then popularity of the modern supermarket. Fruits and vegetables out of season, or grown in distant locations, are now available at relatively low prices. Refrigerators have led to a huge increase in meat and dairy products as a portion of overall supermarket sales. As well as changing the goods purchased at the market, the ability to store these foods for extended periods of time has led to an increase in leisure time. Prior to the advent of the household refrigerator, people would have to shop on a daily basis for the supplies needed for their meals.

=== Impact on nutrition ===
The introduction of refrigeration allowed for the hygienic handling and storage of perishables, and as such, promoted output growth, consumption, and the availability of nutrition. The change in our method of food preservation moved us away from salts to a more manageable sodium level. The ability to move and store perishables such as meat and dairy led to a 1.7% increase in dairy consumption and overall protein intake by 1.25% annually in the US after the 1890s.

People were not only consuming these perishables because it became easier for they themselves to store them, but because the innovations in refrigerated transportation and storage led to less spoilage and waste, thereby driving the prices of these products down. Refrigeration accounts for at least 5.1% of the increase in adult stature (in the US) through improved nutrition, and when the indirect effects associated with improvements in the quality of nutrients and the reduction in illness is additionally factored in, the overall impact becomes considerably larger. Recent studies have also shown a negative relationship between the number of refrigerators in a household and the rate of gastric cancer mortality.

== Current applications of refrigeration ==
Probably the most widely used current applications of refrigeration are for air conditioning of private homes and public buildings, and refrigerating foodstuffs in homes, restaurants and large storage warehouses. The use of refrigerators and walk-in coolers and freezers in kitchens, factories and warehouses for storing and processing fruits and vegetables has allowed adding fresh salads to the modern diet year round, and storing fish and meats safely for long periods. The optimum temperature range for perishable food storage is 3 to 5 °C (37 to 41 °F).

In commerce and manufacturing, there are many uses for refrigeration. Refrigeration is used to liquefy gases such as oxygen, nitrogen, propane, and methane. In compressed air purification, it is used to condense water vapor from compressed air to reduce its moisture content. In oil refineries, chemical plants, and petrochemical plants, refrigeration is used to maintain certain processes at their needed low temperatures (for example, in alkylation of butenes and butane to produce a high-octane gasoline component). Metal workers use refrigeration to temper steel and cutlery. When transporting temperature-sensitive foodstuffs and other materials by trucks, trains, airplanes and seagoing vessels, refrigeration is a necessity.

Dairy products are constantly in need of refrigeration, and it was only discovered in the past few decades that eggs needed to be refrigerated during shipment rather than waiting to be refrigerated after arrival at the grocery store. Meats, poultry and fish all must be kept in climate-controlled environments before being sold. Refrigeration also helps keep fruits and vegetables edible longer.

One of the most influential uses of refrigeration was in the development of the sushi/sashimi industry in Japan. Before the discovery of refrigeration, many sushi connoisseurs were at risk of contracting diseases. The dangers of unrefrigerated sashimi were not brought to light for decades due to the lack of research and healthcare distribution across rural Japan. Around mid-century, the Zojirushi corporation, based in Kyoto, made breakthroughs in refrigerator designs, making refrigerators cheaper and more accessible for restaurant proprietors and the general public.

== Methods of refrigeration ==
Methods of refrigeration can be classified as non-cyclic, cyclic, thermoelectric and magnetic.

=== Non-cyclic refrigeration ===
This refrigeration method cools a contained area by melting ice, by sublimating dry ice, or evaporating liquid nitrogen. A simple example of this is a portable cooler, where ice is poured over the items that need to be refrigerated, keeping them cool and insulated from heat. Regular ice maintains freezing temperatures, but not below the freezing point, unless salt is used to cool the ice down further (as in a traditional ice-cream maker). Mixtures of other solvents with coolants like water ice, dry ice, or liquid nitrogen are also used to make cooling baths for chemistry. Dry ice can reliably bring the temperature well below the freezing point of water, to as low as 195K.

=== Cyclic refrigeration ===
This consists of a refrigeration cycle, where heat is removed from a low-temperature space or source and rejected to a high-temperature sink with the help of external work, inverse of the thermodynamic power cycle. In the power cycle, heat is supplied from a high-temperature source to the engine, part of the heat being used to produce work and the rest being rejected to a low-temperature sink. This satisfies the second law of thermodynamics.

A refrigeration cycle describes the changes that take place in the refrigerant as it alternately absorbs and rejects heat as it circulates through a refrigerator. It is also applied to heating, ventilation, and air conditioning HVACR work, when describing the "process" of refrigerant flow through an HVACR unit, whether it is a packaged or split system.

Heat naturally flows from hot to cold. Work is applied to cool a living space or storage volume by pumping heat from a lower temperature heat source into a higher temperature heat sink. Insulation is used to reduce the work and energy needed to achieve and maintain a lower temperature in the cooled space. The operating principle of the refrigeration cycle was described mathematically by Sadi Carnot in 1824 as a heat engine.

The most common types of refrigeration systems use the reverse-Rankine vapor-compression refrigeration cycle, although absorption heat pumps are used in a minority of applications.

Cyclic refrigeration can be classified as:

1. Vapor cycle, and
2. Gas cycle

Vapor cycle refrigeration can further be classified as:

1. Vapor-compression refrigeration
2. Sorption refrigeration
  1. Vapor-absorption refrigeration
  2. Adsorption refrigeration

==== Vapor-compression cycle ====
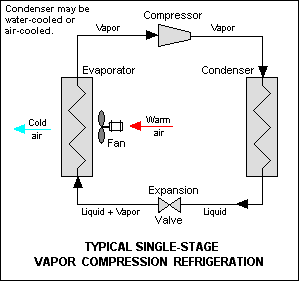
Figure 1: Vapor compression refrigeration

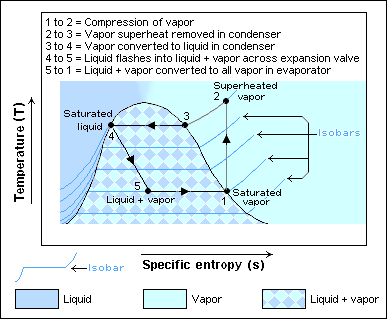
Figure 2: Temperature–Entropy diagram

The vapor-compression cycle is used in most household refrigerators as well as in many large commercial and industrial refrigeration systems. Figure 1 provides a schematic diagram of the components of a typical vapor-compression refrigeration system.

The thermodynamics of the cycle can be analyzed on a diagram as shown in Figure 2. In this cycle, a circulating refrigerant such as a low boiling hydrocarbon or hydrofluorocarbons enters the compressor as a vapour. From point 1 to point 2, the vapor is compressed at constant entropy and exits the compressor as a vapor at a higher temperature, but still below the vapor pressure at that temperature. From point 2 to point 3 and on to point 4, the vapor travels through the condenser which cools the vapour until it starts condensing, and then condenses the vapor into a liquid by removing additional heat at constant pressure and temperature. Between points 4 and 5, the liquid refrigerant goes through the expansion valve (also called a throttle valve) where its pressure abruptly decreases, causing flash evaporation and auto-refrigeration of, typically, less than half of the liquid.

That results in a mixture of liquid and vapour at a lower temperature and pressure as shown at point 5. The cold liquid-vapor mixture then travels through the evaporator coil or tubes and is completely vaporized by cooling the warm air (from the space being refrigerated) being blown by a fan across the evaporator coil or tubes. The resulting refrigerant vapour returns to the compressor inlet at point 1 to complete the thermodynamic cycle.

The above discussion is based on the ideal vapour-compression refrigeration cycle, and does not take into account real-world effects like frictional pressure drop in the system, slight thermodynamic irreversibility during the compression of the refrigerant vapor, or non-ideal gas behavior, if any. Vapor compression refrigerators can be arranged in two stages in cascade refrigeration systems, with the second stage cooling the condenser of the first stage. This can be used for achieving very low temperatures.

More information about the design and performance of vapor-compression refrigeration systems is available in the classic Perry's Chemical Engineers' Handbook.

==== Absorption cycle ====
In an absorption refrigeration system, thermal energy is used to drive a refrigerant through an absorber–generator solution circuit rather than relying primarily on a mechanical compressor. Absorption refrigeration has a long history: an ammonia–water machine was introduced by Ferdinand Carré in 1859, and lithium bromide–water systems were introduced for industrial applications in the 1950s.

The refrigerant evaporates at low pressure and is absorbed into a liquid absorbent. The resulting solution is pumped to a higher pressure and heated in a generator, which separates refrigerant vapour from the solution. The refrigerant then condenses, expands and returns to the evaporator, while the absorbent solution returns to the absorber.

Two important working-fluid pairs are ammonia–water, in which ammonia is the refrigerant and water is the absorbent, and water–lithium bromide, in which water is the refrigerant and lithium bromide is the absorbent. The choice of working pair affects operating pressure, temperature range and system performance.

Because absorption systems can be driven by thermal energy, they can use sources such as industrial waste heat that might otherwise be rejected to the environment. Their performance and suitability relative to vapor-compression refrigeration depend on the working pair, cycle configuration, heat-source temperature and operating conditions.

==== Adsorption cycle ====
Adsorption refrigeration also uses a thermally driven sorption process, but the refrigerant is taken up by a solid adsorbent rather than dissolved in a liquid absorbent. Common adsorption working pairs include water with silica gel or zeolite, and methanol with activated carbon.

In a basic adsorption cycle, heating the adsorbent releases refrigerant vapour, which is condensed. When the adsorbent is subsequently cooled, it adsorbs refrigerant vapour again; evaporation of the refrigerant during this part of the cycle produces the cooling effect. Adsorption systems can be driven by low-grade heat sources, including solar or waste heat.

Adsorption refrigeration has been extensively studied as an alternative to conventional vapor-compression cooling. Reviews have noted advantages such as the potential use of low-grade thermal energy and relatively simple solid-sorbent systems, while also identifying limitations including comparatively low performance and continuing technical and economic challenges.

The main difference from absorption cycle is that in adsorption cycle, the refrigerant (adsorbate) can be ammonia, water, methanol, etc., while the adsorbent is a solid, such as silica gel, activated carbon, or zeolite, while in the absorption cycle the absorbent is liquid.

The reason adsorption refrigeration technology has been extensively researched in recent 30 years lies in that the operation of an adsorption refrigeration system is often noiseless, non-corrosive and environmentally friendly.

==== Gas cycle ====
In a gas refrigeration cycle, the working fluid remains gaseous while it is compressed and expanded; unlike a vapor-compression cycle, it does not undergo condensation and evaporation. Air is commonly used as the working fluid in air-cycle refrigeration. In a basic air cycle, air is compressed, cooled in a heat exchanger, expanded to reduce its temperature, and then absorbs heat from the space or system being cooled.

Air-cycle refrigeration is based on the reverse Brayton cycle. In aircraft systems, compressed air is cooled in a heat exchanger and then expanded through a turbine to produce refrigerated air. Reverse-Brayton air refrigeration generally has a lower coefficient of performance than conventional vapor-compression refrigeration, although its low mass, compactness and reliability make it suitable for aircraft environmental-control applications.

Air-cycle refrigeration is the predominant method of air conditioning in commercial and military aircraft. In conventional bleed-air systems, air supplied from a gas-turbine engine compressor is cooled and expanded in an air cycle machine before being supplied to the aircraft environmental-control system. Air-cycle machines typically combine a turbine with a compressor, fan, or both. Some newer aircraft instead use electrically powered bleedless air-cycle systems.

=== Thermoelectric refrigeration ===
Thermoelectric cooling uses the Peltier effect to transfer heat when an electric current passes through junctions of dissimilar thermoelectric materials. Thermoelectric cooling is used in applications including electronic thermal management and scientific instrumentation.

Thermoelectric coolers have no mechanical moving parts and can be compact and lightweight, making them useful where the size, mass or mechanical complexity of conventional refrigeration is undesirable.

For larger temperature differences, thermoelectric modules can be arranged in multiple stages, with successive stages removing both the heat transferred from the cooled region and heat generated by preceding stages.

The performance of a thermoelectric cooler depends on factors including thermoelectric material properties, operating temperatures, electrical current and thermal resistances. For conventional space-cooling and food-refrigeration applications, thermoelectric systems generally have a lower coefficient of performance than vapor-compression systems and therefore require more electrical input for the same cooling load.

=== Magnetic refrigeration ===
Magnetic refrigeration, or adiabatic demagnetization, is a cooling technology based on the magnetocaloric effect, an intrinsic property of magnetic solids. The refrigerant is often a paramagnetic salt, such as cerium magnesium nitrate. The active magnetic dipoles in this case are those of the electron shells of the paramagnetic atoms.

A strong magnetic field is applied to the refrigerant, forcing its various magnetic dipoles to align and putting these degrees of freedom of the refrigerant into a state of lowered entropy. A heat sink then absorbs the heat released by the refrigerant due to its loss of entropy. Thermal contact with the heat sink is then broken so that the system is insulated, and the magnetic field is switched off. This increases the heat capacity of the refrigerant, thus decreasing its temperature below the temperature of the heat sink.

Because few materials exhibit the needed properties at room temperature, applications have so far been limited to cryogenics and research.

=== Other methods ===
Other methods of refrigeration include the air cycle machine used in aircraft; the vortex tube used for spot cooling, when compressed air is available; and thermoacoustic refrigeration using sound waves in a pressurized gas to drive heat transfer and heat exchange; steam jet cooling popular in the early 1930s for air conditioning large buildings; thermoelastic cooling using a smart metal alloy stretching and relaxing. Many Stirling cycle heat engines can be run backwards to act as a refrigerator, and therefore these engines have a niche use in cryogenics. In addition, there are other types of cryocoolers such as Gifford-McMahon coolers, Joule-Thomson coolers, pulse-tube refrigerators and, for temperatures between 2 mK and 500 mK, dilution refrigerators.

=== Elastocaloric refrigeration ===
Another potential solid-state refrigeration technique and a relatively new area of study comes from a special property of super elastic materials. These materials undergo a temperature change when experiencing an applied mechanical stress (called the elastocaloric effect). Since super elastic materials deform reversibly at high strains, the material experiences a flattened elastic region in its stress-strain curve caused by a resulting phase transformation from an austenitic to a martensitic crystal phase.

When a super elastic material experiences a stress in the austenitic phase, it undergoes an exothermic phase transformation to the martensitic phase, which causes the material to heat up. Removing the stress reverses the process, restores the material to its austenitic phase, and absorbs heat from the surroundings cooling down the material.

The most appealing part of this research is how potentially energy efficient and environmentally friendly this cooling technology is. The different materials used, commonly shape-memory alloys, provide a non-toxic source of emission free refrigeration. The most commonly studied materials studied are shape-memory alloys, like nitinol and Cu-Zn-Al. Nitinol is of the more promising alloys with output heat at about 66 J/cm^{3} and a temperature change of about 16–20 K. Due to the difficulty in manufacturing some of the shape memory alloys, alternative materials like natural rubber have been studied. Even though rubber may not give off as much heat per volume (12 J/cm^{3} ) as the shape memory alloys, it still generates a comparable temperature change of about 12 K and operates at a suitable temperature range, low stresses, and low cost.

The main challenge however comes from potential energy losses in the form of hysteresis, often associated with this process. Since most of these losses comes from incompatibilities between the two phases, proper alloy tuning is necessary to reduce losses and increase reversibility and efficiency. Balancing the transformation strain of the material with the energy losses enables a large elastocaloric effect to occur and potentially a new alternative for refrigeration.

=== Fridge Gate ===
The Fridge Gate method is a theoretical application of using a single logic gate to drive a refrigerator in the most energy efficient way possible without violating the laws of thermodynamics. It operates on the fact that there are two energy states in which a particle can exist: the ground state and the excited state. The excited state carries a little more energy than the ground state, small enough so that the transition occurs with high probability. There are three components or particle types associated with the fridge gate. The first is on the interior of the refrigerator, the second on the outside and the third is connected to a power supply which heats up every so often that it can reach the E state and replenish the source. In the cooling step on the inside of the refrigerator, the g state particle absorbs energy from ambient particles, cooling them, and itself jumping to the e state. In the second step, on the outside of the refrigerator where the particles are also at an e state, the particle falls to the g state, releasing energy and heating the outside particles. In the third and final step, the power supply moves a particle at the e state, and when it falls to the g state it induces an energy-neutral swap where the interior e particle is replaced by a new g particle, restarting the cycle.

=== Passive systems ===
When combining a passive daytime radiative cooling system with thermal insulation and evaporative cooling, one study found a 300% increase in ambient cooling power when compared to a stand-alone radiative cooling surface, which could extend the shelf life of food by 40% in humid climates and 200% in desert climates without refrigeration. The system's evaporative cooling layer would require water "re-charges" every 10 days to a month in humid areas and every 4 days in hot and dry areas.

A refrigeration system's coefficient of performance (CoP) is an important measure of its performance. It is defined as refrigeration capacity divided by the energy input required to operate the system. While CoP is a simple measure of performance, other measures such as performance factor (PF) are also used in some industrial refrigeration applications. A system's PF relates energy input to refrigeration capacity, and both CoP and PF depend on operating conditions, including temperatures and thermal loads.

== See also ==
- Air conditioning
- Cryopreservation
- Heat pump and refrigeration cycle
- Redundant refrigeration system
- Refrigerant
- World Refrigeration Day
