= Steam generator (railroad) =

Steam boiler for railroad passenger cars

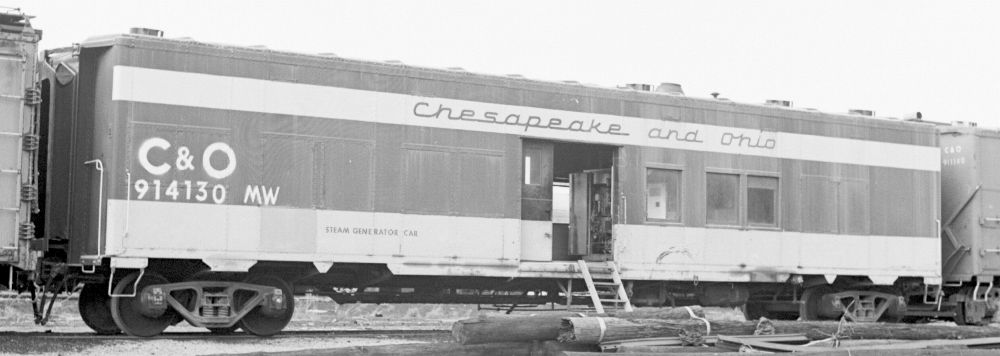
Chesapeake and Ohio Railway #914130, a troop sleeper that has been converted to a steam generator car

A steam generator is a type of boiler used to produce steam for climate control and potable water heating in railroad passenger cars. The output of a railroad steam generator is low-pressure, saturated steam that is passed through a system of pipes and conduits throughout the length of the train.

Steam generators were developed when diesel locomotives started to replace steam locomotives on passenger trains. In most cases, each passenger locomotive was fitted with a steam generator and a feedwater supply tank. The steam generator used some of the locomotive's diesel fuel supply for combustion. When a steam-generator–equipped locomotive was not available for a run, a so-called "heating car" fitted with one or two steam generators was inserted between the last locomotive in the consist and the rest of the train.

Steam generators would also be fitted to individual cars to enable them to be heated independently of any locomotive supply.

In Ireland, Córas Iompair Éireann used "heating cars" as standard and CIÉ diesel locomotives were not fitted with steam generators.

== Background ==
=== Solid fuel ===
In the first decades of passenger railroading, cars were heated by a wood or coal fired stove if heated at all. It was difficult to evenly heat the long, drafty cars, and passengers near the stove often found it uncomfortably hot, while those further away gained little heat at all. The stoves were also a safety hazard; cars were often ignited by embers from the stove, especially in a wreck, when a dislodged stove would overturn, dumping burning coals into the car.

=== High-pressure steam ===
The use of steam from the locomotive to heat cars was first employed in the late 19th century. High-pressure steam from the locomotive was passed through the train via pipes and hoses. The dangers of this arrangement became clear with numerous accidents after introduction.

=== Low-pressure steam ===
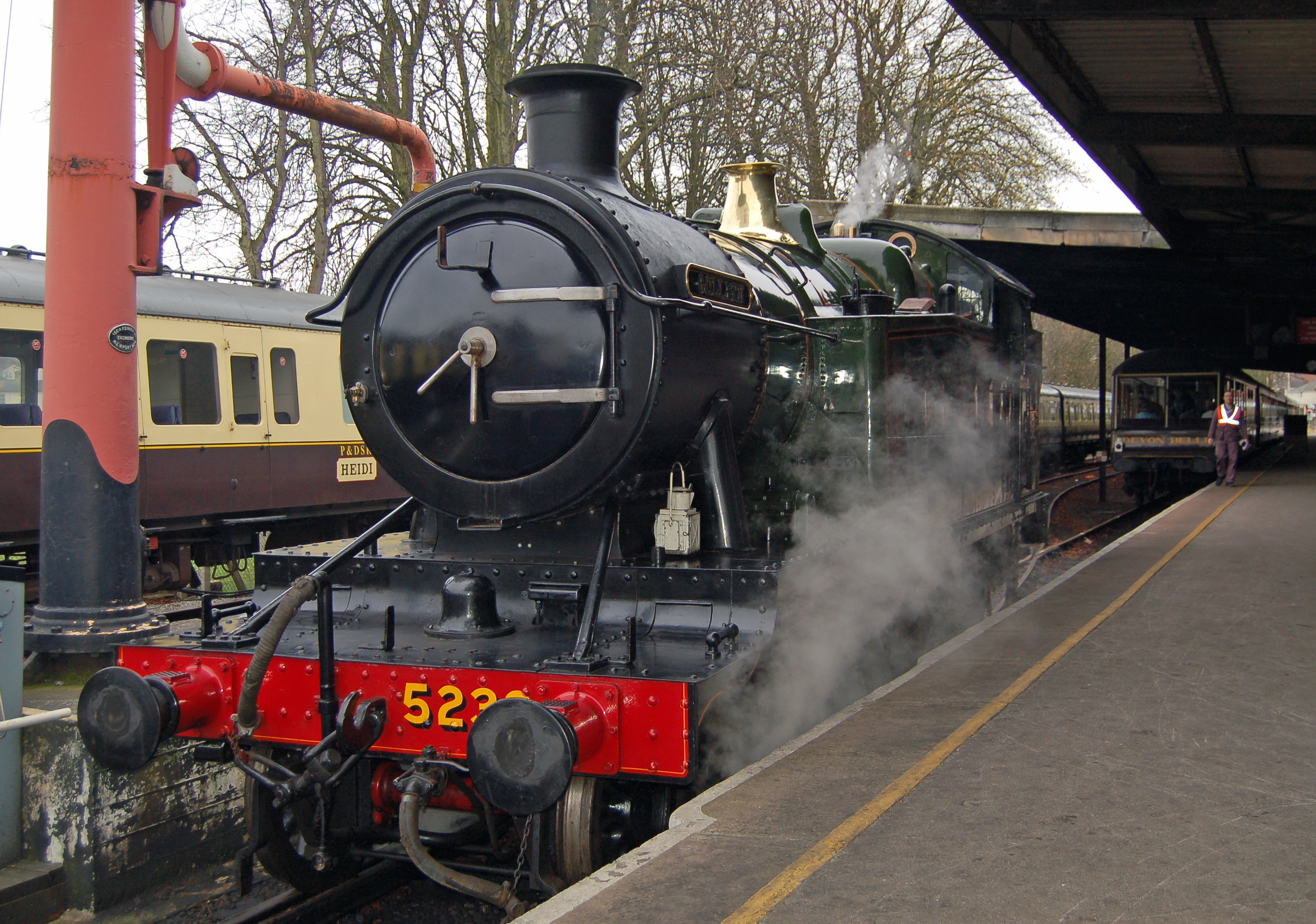
GWR 52xx class, showing the steam heating hoses. The hose above the buffer beam is for the vacuum brake, that below the number and to the photograph's right is for steam heating.

In 1903, Chicago businessman Egbert Gold introduced the "Vapor" car heating system, which used low-pressure, saturated steam. The Vapor system was safe and efficient, and became nearly universal in railroad applications.

=== Introduction of the steam generator ===
When steam locomotives began to be retired from passenger runs, Gold's company, now known as the Vapor Car Heating Company, developed a compact water-tube boiler that could be fitted into the rear of a diesel locomotive's engine room. Known as the Vapor-Clarkson steam generator, it and its competitors (notably the unit built by Elesco) remained a standard railroad appliance until steam heat was phased out.

In 1914–16, the Chicago, Milwaukee & St Paul Railway electrified some 440 miles (710 kilometres) of their line going over the Rocky Mountains and Cascade Range with the 3 kV DC overhead system. The motive power was EF-1s and EP-1s by American Locomotive Company (Alco) with electrical equipment by General Electric. These articulated 2-section engines in passenger version were equipped with 2 oil-fired steam boilers, one in each section.

In Great Britain, steam generators were built for British Railways diesel locomotives by three firms - Spanner, Clayton and Stone. All types were notoriously unreliable and failures were very common.

In Poland, vapor steam generators were fitted to diesel passenger locomotives of the SP45 class. The boilers were removed in the 80s and 90s and replaced with 3 kV DC generators driven by main engine, when maintenance became too expensive and remaining cars not fitted with electric heating were withdrawn from service.

The New Zealand, electric locomotives class ED, used in and around Wellington, were fitted with oil-fired steam boilers manufactured by the Sentinel Waggon Works. The boilers appeared to have been used very rarely and were removed during the locomotives’ operational lives.

== Steam generator types ==
=== Oil-fired ===
These burned diesel fuel, which is a lightweight fuel oil. The term steam generator (as opposed to boiler) usually refers to an automated unit with a long spiral tube that water is pumped through and is surrounded by flame and hot gases, with steam issuing at the output end. There is no pressure vessel in the ordinary sense of a boiler. Because there is no capacity for storage, the steam generator's output must change to meet demand. Automatic regulators varied the water feed, fuel feed, and combustion air volume.

By pumping slightly more water in than can be evaporated, the output was a mixture of steam and a bit of water with concentrated dissolved solids. A steam separator removed the water before the steam was fed to the train. An automatic blowdown valve would be periodically cycled to eject solids and sludge from the separator. This reduced limescale buildup caused by boiling hard water. Scale build-up that occurred had to be removed with acid washouts.

The New Zealand ED class (1,500 volts) electric locomotive used around Wellington from 1940 originally had oil-fired water tube boilers for passenger carriage steam heaters, which were later removed. Initially diesel-hauled passenger trains like the Northerner on the North Island Main Trunk had a separate steam heating van, but later the carriages of long-distance trains like the Overlander used electric heaters supplied by a separate power or combined power-luggage van.

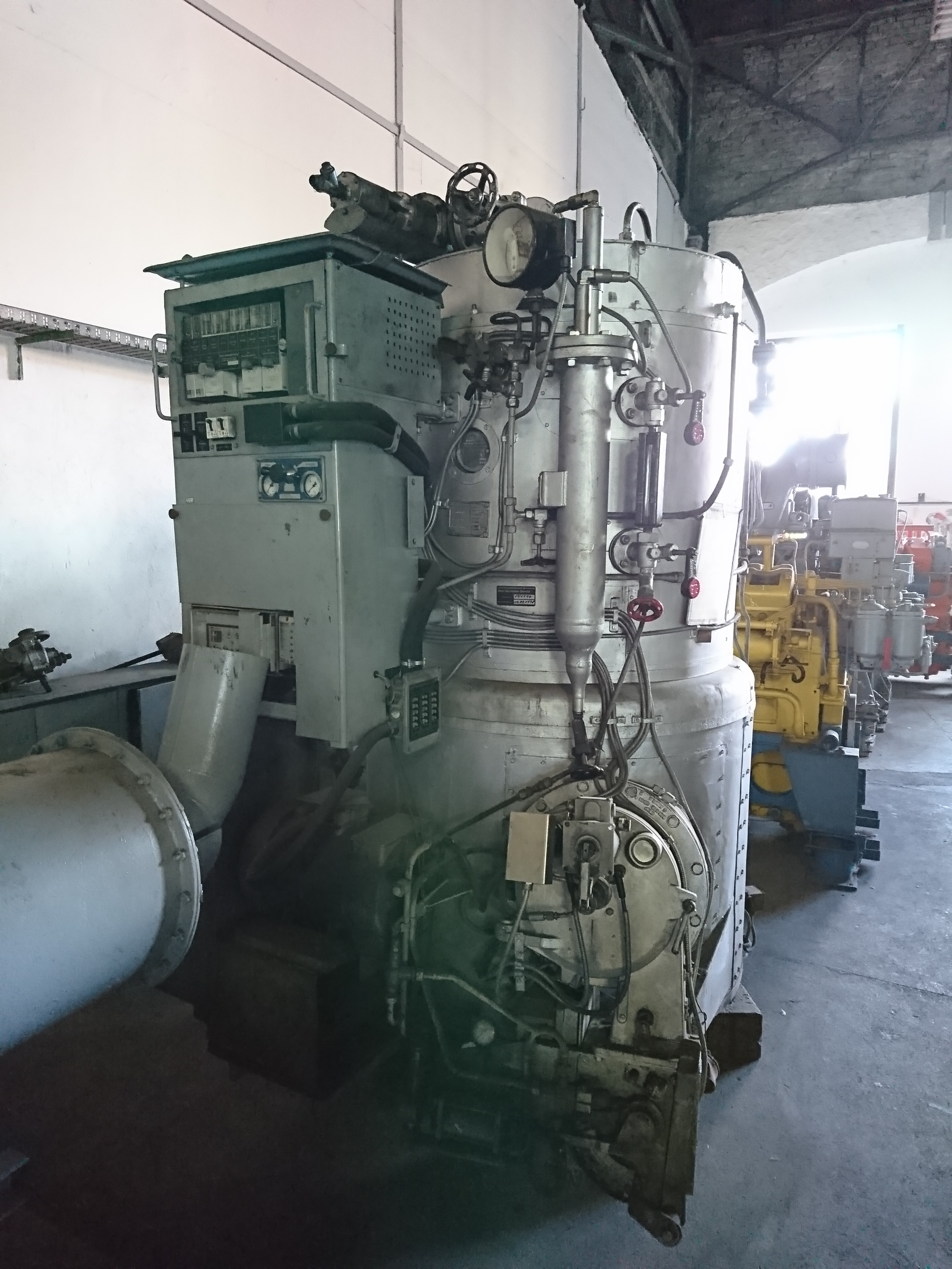
Train heating boiler, type “Köthen”, at the Saxon Railway Museum

=== Electrically-heated ===
In British electric locomotives the steam generator was usually an electric steam boiler, heated by a large electric immersion heater running at the (then) line voltages of 600 volts from a third rail or 1,500 volts from an overhead wire.

The Polish electric locomotive EL204 of 1937 was fitted with an electric steam generator supplied from overhead lines. The locomotive was destroyed during World War II.

== See also ==
- Head-end power, a technology that has largely replaced steam generators in the second half of the 20th century
- Electric–steam locomotives
- Steam generator (boiler)
- Steam jet cooling
