= Injector =

Type of pump using high pressure fluid to entrain a lower pressure fluid

Injector typically used in steam locomotives

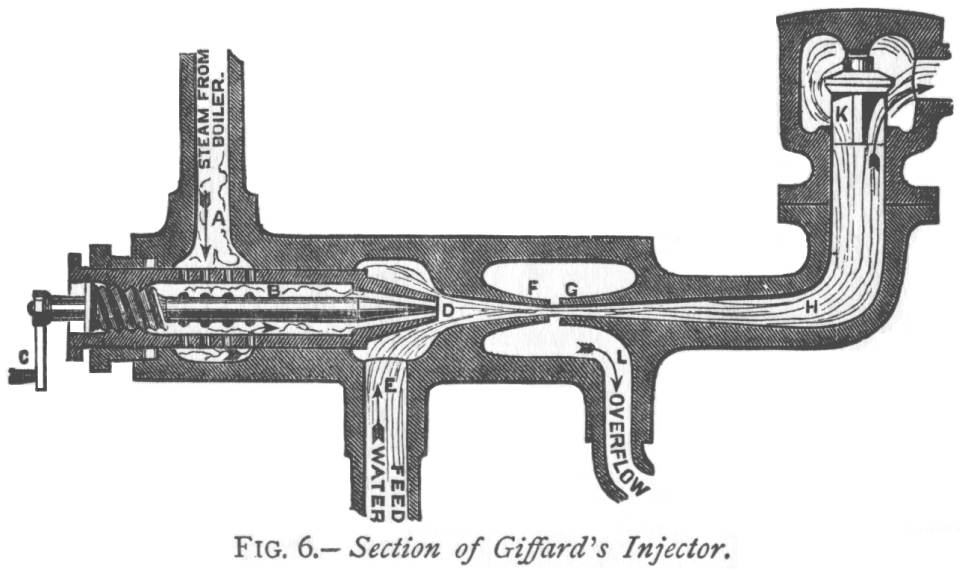
A- Steam from boiler, B- Needle valve, C- Needle valve handle, D- Steam and water combine, E- Water feed, F- Combining cone, G- Delivery nozzle and cone, H- delivery chamber and pipe, K- Check valve, L- Overflow

An injector is a system of ducting and nozzles used to direct the flow of a high-pressure fluid in such a way that a lower pressure fluid is entrained in the jet and carried through a duct to a region of higher pressure. It is a fluid-dynamic pump with no moving parts except a valve to control inlet flow.

Depending on the application, an injector can also take the form of an eductor-jet pump, a water eductor or an aspirator. An ejector operates on similar principles to create a vacuum feed connection for braking systems etc.

The motive fluid may be a liquid, steam or any other gas. The entrained suction fluid may be a gas, a liquid, a slurry, or a dust-laden gas stream.

== Steam injector ==
The steam injector is a common device used for delivering water to steam boilers, especially in steam locomotives. It is a typical application of the injector principle used to deliver cold water to a boiler against its own pressure, using its own live or exhaust steam, replacing any mechanical pump. When first developed, its operation was intriguing because it seemed paradoxical, almost like perpetual motion, but it was later explained using thermodynamics. Other types of injector may use other pressurised motive fluids such as air.

== History ==
=== Giffard ===
The injector was invented by Henri Giffard in early 1850s and patented in France in 1858, for use on steam locomotives. It was patented in the United Kingdom by Sharp, Stewart and Company of Glasgow.

After some initial scepticism resulting from the unfamiliar and superficially paradoxical mode of operation, the injector became widely adopted for steam locomotives as an alternative to mechanical pumps.

=== Kneass ===
Strickland Landis Kneass was a civil engineer, experimenter, and author, with many accomplishments involving railroading. Kneass began publishing a mathematical model of the physics of the injector, which he had verified by experimenting with steam. A steam injector has three primary sections:

- Steam nozzle, a diverging duct, which converts high pressure steam to low pressure, high velocity wet steam
- Combining tube, a converging duct, which mixes high velocity steam and cold water
- Delivery tube, a diverging duct, where a high velocity stream of steam and cold water become a slow high pressure stream of water

==== Nozzle ====
Kneass's illustrations of differently shaped steam nozzles

Figure 15 shows four sketches Kneass drew of steam passing through a nozzle. In general, compressible flows through a diverging duct increase velocity as a gas expands. The two sketches at the bottom of figure 15 are both diverging, but the bottom one is slightly curved, and produces the highest velocity flow parallel to the axis. The area of a duct is proportional to the square of the diameter, and the curvature allows the steam to expand more linearly as it passes through the duct.

An ideal gas cools during adiabatic expansion (without adding heat), releasing less energy than the same gas would during isothermal expansion (constant temperature). Expansion of steam follows an intermediate thermodynamic process called the Rankine cycle. Steam does more work than an ideal gas, because steam remains hot during expansion.

The extra heat comes from enthalpy of vaporization, as some of the steam condenses back into droplets of water intermixed with steam.

==== Combining tube ====
At the end of the nozzle, the steam has very high velocity, but at less than atmospheric pressure, drawing in cold water which becomes entrained in the stream, where the steam condenses into droplets of water in a converging duct.

==== Delivery tube ====
The delivery tube is a diverging duct where the force of deceleration increases pressure, allowing the stream of water to enter the boiler.

== Operation ==
The injector consists of a body filled with a secondary fluid, into which a motive fluid is injected. The motive fluid induces the secondary fluid to move. Injectors exist in many variations, and can have several stages, each repeating the same basic operating principle, to increase their overall effect.

It uses the Venturi effect of a converging-diverging nozzle on a steam jet to convert the pressure energy of the steam to velocity energy, reducing its pressure to below that of the atmosphere, which enables it to entrain a fluid (e.g., water). After passing through the convergent "combining cone", the mixed fluid is fully condensed. The condensate mixture then enters a divergent "delivery cone" which slows the jet, converting kinetic energy back into static pressure energy above the pressure of the boiler enabling its feed through a non-return valve.

Most of the heat energy in the condensed steam is returned to the boiler, increasing the thermal efficiency of the process. Injectors are therefore typically over 98% energy-efficient overall; they are also simple compared to the many moving parts in a feed pump.

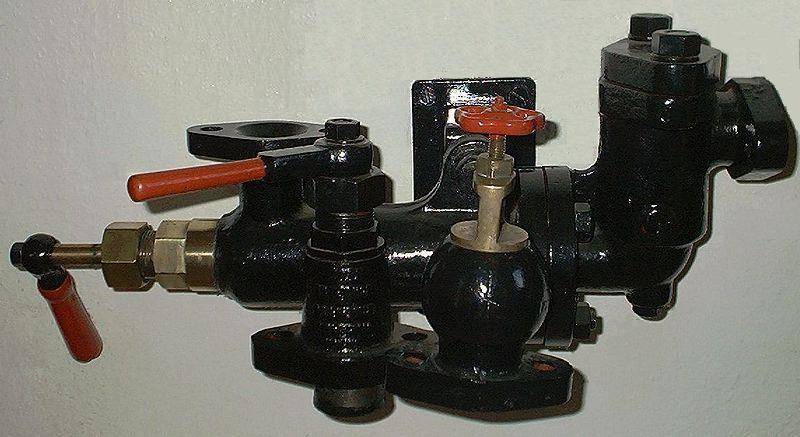
Steam injector of a locomotive boiler

=== Key design parameters ===
Fluid feed rate and operating pressure range are the key parameters of an injector, and vacuum pressure and evacuation rate are the key parameters for an ejector.

Compression ratio and the entrainment ratio may also be defined:

The compression ratio of the injector, $P_2/P_1$, is defined as ratio of the injector's outlet pressure $P_2$ to the inlet pressure of the suction fluid $P_1$.

The entrainment ratio of the injector, $W_s/W_m$, is defined as the amount $W_s$ (in kg/h) of suction fluid that can be entrained and compressed by a given amount $W_m$ (in kg/h) of motive fluid.

=== Lifting properties ===
Other key properties of an injector include the fluid inlet pressure requirements i.e. whether it is lifting or non-lifting.

In a non-lifting injector, positive inlet fluid pressure is needed e.g. the cold water input is fed by gravity.

The steam-cone minimal orifice diameter is kept larger than the combining cone minimal diameter. The non-lifting Nathan 4000 injector used on the Southern Pacific 4294 could push 12,000 US gallons (45,000 L) per hour at 250 psi (17 bar).

The lifting injector can operate with negative inlet fluid pressure i.e. fluid lying below the level of the injector. It differs from the non-lifting type mainly in the relative dimensions of the nozzles.

=== Overflow ===
An overflow is required for excess steam or water to discharge, especially during starting. If the injector cannot initially overcome boiler pressure, the overflow allows the injector to continue to draw water and steam.

=== Check valve ===
There is at least one check valve (called a "clack valve" in locomotives because of the distinctive noise it makes) between the exit of the injector and the boiler to prevent back flow, and usually a valve to prevent air being sucked in at the overflow.

=== Exhaust steam injector ===
Efficiency was further improved by the development of a multi-stage injector which is powered not by live steam from the boiler but by exhaust steam from the cylinders, thereby making use of the residual energy in the exhaust steam which would otherwise go to waste. However, an exhaust injector also cannot work when the locomotive is stationary; later exhaust injectors could use a supply of live steam if no exhaust steam was available.

=== Problems ===
Injectors can be troublesome under certain running conditions, such as when vibration causes the combined steam and water jet to "knock off". Originally the injector had to be restarted by careful manipulation of the steam and water controls, and the distraction caused by a malfunctioning injector was largely responsible for the 1913 Ais Gill rail accident. Later injectors were designed to automatically restart on sensing the collapse in vacuum from the steam jet, for example with a spring-loaded delivery cone.

Another common problem occurs when the incoming water is too warm and is less effective at condensing the steam in the combining cone. That can also occur if the metal body of the injector is too hot, e.g. from prolonged use.

The internal parts of an injector are subject to erosive wear, particularly damage at the throat of the delivery cone which may be due to cavitation.

=== Vacuum ejectors ===
Diagram of a typical modern ejector

An additional use for the injector technology is in vacuum ejectors in continuous train braking systems, which were made compulsory in the UK by the Regulation of Railways Act 1889. A vacuum ejector uses steam pressure to draw air out of the vacuum pipe and reservoirs of continuous train brake. Steam locomotives, with a ready source of steam, found ejector technology ideal with its rugged simplicity and lack of moving parts. A steam locomotive usually has two ejectors: a large ejector for releasing the brakes when stationary and a small ejector for maintaining the vacuum against leaks. The exhaust from the ejectors is invariably directed to the smokebox, by which means it assists the blower in draughting the fire. The small ejector is sometimes replaced by a reciprocating pump driven from the crosshead because this is more economical of steam and is only required to operate when the train is moving.

Vacuum brakes have been superseded by air brakes in modern trains, which allow the use of smaller brake cylinders and/or higher braking force due to the greater difference from atmospheric pressure.

=== Earlier application of the principle ===
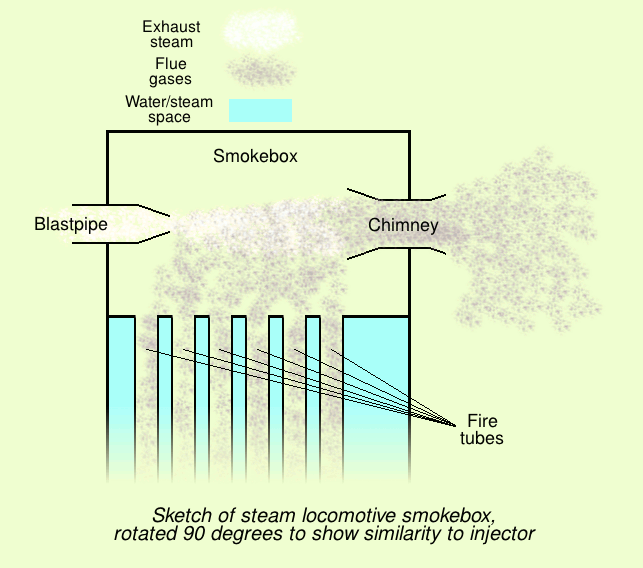
Sketch of the smokebox of a steam locomotive, rotated 90 degrees. The similarity to the generic injector diagram at the top of this article is apparent.

An empirical application of the principle was in widespread use on steam locomotives before its formal development as the injector, in the form of the arrangement of the blastpipe and chimney in the locomotive smokebox. The sketch on the right shows a cross section through a smokebox, rotated 90 degrees; it can be seen that the same components are present, albeit differently named, as in the generic diagram of an injector at the top of the article. Exhaust steam from the cylinders is directed through a nozzle on the end of the blastpipe, to reduce pressure inside the smokebox by entraining the flue gases from the boiler which are then ejected via the chimney. The effect is to increase the draught on the fire to a degree proportional to the rate of steam consumption, so that as more steam is used, more heat is generated from the fire and steam production is also increased. The effect was first noted by Richard Trevithick and subsequently developed empirically by the early locomotive engineers; Stephenson's Rocket made use of it, and this constitutes much of the reason for its notably improved performance in comparison with contemporary machines.

== Modern uses ==
The use of injectors (or ejectors) in various industrial applications has become quite common due to their relative simplicity and adaptability. For example:

- To inject chemicals into the boiler drums of small, stationary, low pressure boilers. In large, high-pressure modern boilers, usage of injectors for chemical dosing is not possible due to their limited outlet pressures.
- In thermal power stations, they are used for the removal of the boiler bottom ash, the removal of fly ash from the hoppers of the electrostatic precipitators used to remove that ash from the boiler flue gas, and for drawing a vacuum pressure in steam turbine exhaust condensers.
- Jet pumps have been used in boiling water nuclear reactors to circulate the coolant fluid.
- For use in producing a vacuum pressure in steam jet cooling systems.
- For expansion work recovery in air conditioning and refrigeration systems.
- For enhanced oil recovery processes in the oil & gas Industry.
- For the bulk handling of grains or other granular or powdered materials.
- The construction industry uses them for pumping turbid water and slurries.
- Eductors are used in ships to pump residual ballast water, or cargo oil which cannot be removed using centrifugal pumps due to loss of suction head and may damage the centrifugal pump if run dry, which may be caused due to trim or list of the ship.
- Eductors are used on-board ships to pump out bilges, since using centrifugal pump would not be feasible as the suction head may be lost frequently.
- Some aircraft (mostly earlier designs) use an ejector attached to the fuselage to provide vacuum for gyroscopic instruments such as an attitude indicator (artificial horizon).
- Eductors are used in aircraft fuel systems as transfer pumps; fluid flow from an engine-mounted mechanical pump can be delivered to a fuel tank-mounted eductor to transfer fuel from that tank.
- Aspirators are vacuum pumps based on the same operating principle and are used in laboratories to create a partial vacuum and for medical use in suction of mucus or bodily fluids.
- Water eductors are water pumps used for dredging silt and panning for gold, where they can withstand the highly abrasive mixtures.
- To create vacuum system in vacuum distillation unit (oil refinery).
- Vacuum autoclaves use an ejector to pull a vacuum, generally powered by the cold water supply to the machine.
- Low-weight jet pumps can be made out of papier maché.

== Well pumps ==
Jet pumps are commonly used to extract water from water wells. The main pump, often a centrifugal pump, is powered and installed at ground level. Its discharge is split, with the greater part of the flow leaving the system, while a portion of the flow is returned to the jet pump installed below ground in the well. This recirculated part of the pumped fluid is used to power the jet. At the jet pump, the high-energy, low-mass returned flow drives more fluid from the well, becoming a low-energy, high-mass flow which is then piped to the inlet of the main pump.

The S type pump is useful for removing water from a well or container.

Shallow well pumps are those in which the jet assembly is attached directly to the main pump and are limited to a depth of approximately 5-8m to prevent cavitation.

Deep well pumps are those in which the jet is located at the bottom of the well. The maximum depth for deep well pumps is determined by the inside diameter of and the velocity through the jet. The major advantage of jet pumps for deep well installations is the ability to situate all mechanical parts (e.g., electric/petrol motor, rotating impellers) at the ground surface for easy maintenance. The advent of the electrical submersible pump has partly replaced the need for jet type well pumps, except for driven point wells or surface water intakes.

== Multi-stage steam vacuum ejectors ==
In practice, for suction pressure below 100 mbar absolute, more than one ejector is used, usually with condensers between the ejector stages. Condensing of motive steam greatly improves ejector set efficiency; both barometric and shell-and-tube surface condensers are used.

In operation a two-stage system consists of a primary high-vacuum (HV) ejector and a secondary low-vacuum (LV) ejector. Initially the LV ejector is operated to pull vacuum down from the starting pressure to an intermediate pressure. Once this pressure is reached, the HV ejector is then operated in conjunction with the LV ejector to finally pull vacuum to the required pressure.

In operation a three-stage system consists of a primary booster, a secondary high-vacuum (HV) ejector, and a tertiary low-vacuum (LV) ejector. As per the two-stage system, initially the LV ejector is operated to pull vacuum down from the starting pressure to an intermediate pressure. Once this pressure is reached, the HV ejector is then operated in conjunction with the LV ejector to pull vacuum to the lower intermediate pressure. Finally the booster is operated (in conjunction with the HV & LV ejectors) to pull vacuum to the required pressure.

== Construction materials ==
Injectors or ejectors are made of carbon steel, stainless steel, brass, titanium, PTFE, carbon, and other materials.

== See also ==
- Aspirator (pump)
- De Laval nozzle
- Diffusion pump
- Giovanni Battista Venturi
- Gustaf de Laval
- Nozzle
- Surface condenser
- Venturi effect
