= Entrainment (hydrodynamics) =

Movement of one fluid by another

In hydrodynamics, entrainment is the transport of fluid across an interface between two bodies by a shear-induced turbulent flow. Entrainment is important in turbulent jets, plumes, and gravity currents, and is an ongoing topic of research.

== History ==
The entrainment hypothesis was first used as a model for flow in plumes by G. I. Taylor. He was studying the use of oil drum fires to clear fog from airplane runways during World War II.

It became a common model of turbulence closure used in environmental and geophysical fluid mechanics.

== Applications ==
Eductors or eductor-jet pumps make use of entrainment. They are used on board ships to pump out flooded compartments: seawater is pumped to the eductor and forced through a jet, and any fluid at the inlet of the eductor is carried along to the outlet, and then up and out of the compartment. Eductors can pump out whatever can flow through them, including water, oil, and small pieces of wood. Another example is the pump-jet, which is used for marine propulsion. Jet pumps are also used to circulate reactor coolant in several designs of boiling water nuclear reactor.

In power generation, this phenomenon is used in steam jet air ejectors to maintain condenser vacuum by removing non-condensible gases from the condenser.

In theoretical aerodynamics applications the entrainment velocity, which expresses the rate of change of the entrainment, is often used to solve the von Kármán integral for turbulent boundary layers.
