= Kenneth P. Johnson =

American newspaper editor

Kenneth Parker Johnson (August 24, 1934 – November 2, 2008) was an American newspaper editor. Johnson was best known for his efforts in the 1970s and 1980s to build the Dallas Times Herald into one of the nation's most respected newspapers, which ultimately failed when the paper was purchased by its rival The Dallas Morning News in 1991 and promptly shut down.

Johnson was born on August 24, 1934, in Huntington, West Virginia, and graduated in 1953 from high school in Bristol, Tennessee. After completing high school, he took a job as a copyboy with the Bristol Herald Courier of Bristol, Virginia. He attended what is now East Tennessee State University. He worked for the newspaper while he was in college, serving in a succession of posts as sports writer, general assignments reporter, city editor and night editor. After graduating from college in 1960, he was hired as the chief copy editor of the Savannah Morning News in Georgia, and was promoted to city editor and was named managing editor of the paper at age 25, within six months of his hire at the Morning News.

Johnson moved to Washington, D.C., in 1965, where he spent a year as an assistant to George Elliott Hagan, a Democratic Party member of Congress from Georgia. He was hired as night city editor by The Washington Post in 1966, and followed with a series of promotions to news editor, night managing editor, assistant production director, assistant general manager and vice president for operations.

Johnson moved to Dallas in 1975 when he was named executive editor of the Dallas Times Herald. Johnson launched an effort to improve the paper's journalistic standards that resulted in the paper earning two Pulitzer Prizes; Erwin H. Hagler's feature photography for a series on the Western cowboy in 1980 and James B. Dickman's feature photography of life and death in El Salvador in 1983. A bitter competition arose between the Times Herald and The Dallas Morning News that improved reporting across the state but placed both publications in financial difficulty. Investigative coverage by the paper under Johnson included reports on police brutality, imbalances in city property tax appraisals and recruiting violations across football teams in the Southwest Conference. Johnson hired Bill Keller, later executive editor of The New York Times, and newspaper columnist / political commentator Molly Ivins. Johnson remained at the Times Herald until 1984.

The Times Herald planned to print a story that would expose someone as a double agent of U.S. and Soviet intelligence. The article's subject threatened that he would commit suicide if the article was published and followed through on his threat after Johnson made the decision and the paper went ahead and printed the story in February 1976. Johnson stated that "if a story is newsworthy and supported by the facts, it is our policy to publish." The article's subject, Norman J. Rees, committed suicide by a gunshot wound in the head after the article was printed.

In 1985, Johnson formed Westward Communications together with Will D. Jarrett, his former editor at the Times Herald, which bought a series of 41 newspapers and nine shoppers in Arkansas, Colorado, Louisiana and Texas, primarily in small towns. The business bought newspapers with printing presses and then followed by buying surrounding papers that could be printed on the presses already purchased, in a hub and spoke model. The group was sold for an estimated $80 million in 1997, with Mary Walton of American Journalism Review estimating that Johnson and his partner each netted as much as $25 million from the deal, though these numbers were unconfirmed.

Johnson died at age 74 on November 2, 2008, in Dallas of a heart infection at University of Texas Southwestern Medical Center at Dallas.
