= Ferdinand Carré =

French engineer

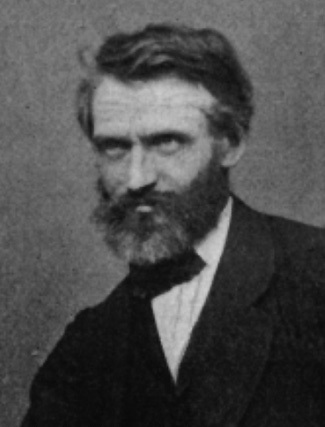
- Born: 11 March 1824; Moislains, Somme, France
- Died: 11 January 1900 (aged 75); Pommeuse, Seine-et-Marne
- Occupation: Engineer Inventor
- Known for: Absorption refrigerator

Ferdinand Philippe Edouard Carré (11 March 1824 – 11 January 1900) was a French engineer, born at Moislains (Somme) on 11 March 1824. Carré is best known as the inventor of refrigeration equipment used to produce ice. He died on 11 January 1900 at Pommeuse (Seine-et-Marne).

== Work ==
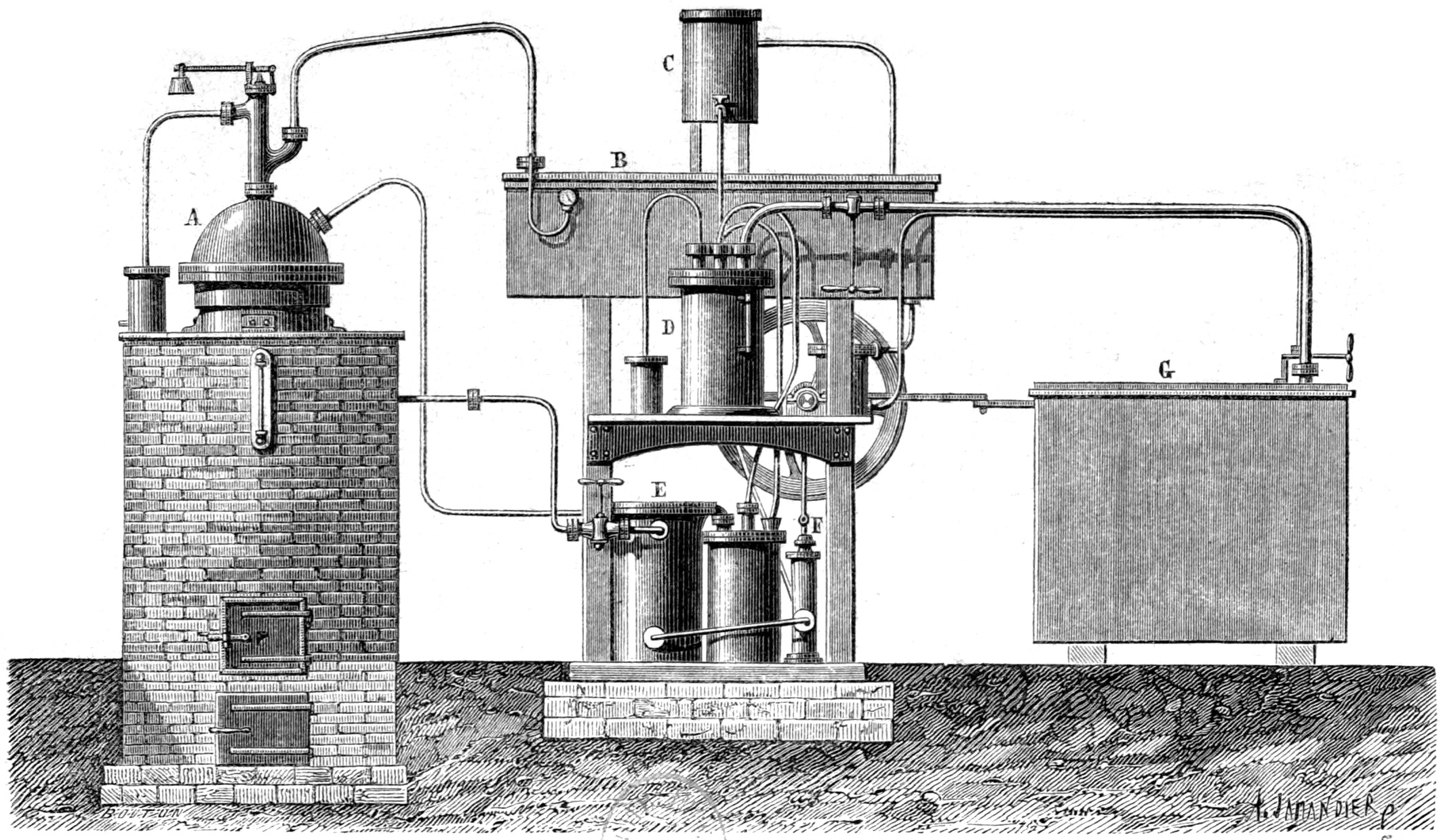
Carré's ice-making device

In 1850, Ferdinand's brother Edmond Carré (22 January 1833 – 7 May 1894) developed the first absorption refrigerator, using water and sulphuric acid. Ferdinand continued Edmond's work on the process and in 1858 developed a machine which used water as the absorbent and ammonia as refrigerant. His absorption machine was patented in France in 1859 and in the United States in 1860. In 1862 he exhibited his ice-making machine at the Universal London Exhibition, producing an output of 200 kilograms (440 lb) per hour. His design was based on the gas–vapour system of Australian inventor James Harrison.

In 1876 he equipped the ship Paraguay with an absorption refrigeration system, allowing the ship to carry frozen meat on an intercontinental trip. Carré's method remained popular through the early 1900s. It was replaced by systems using the liquid vapor compression cycle.

Carré also conducted research in the field of electricity. In 1877, he invented an electric light regulator. He also invented the Carré machine, an electrostatic generator used to produce high voltages.

== See also ==
- Timeline of low-temperature technology
