= Norman J. Rees =

Italian-American oil engineer (c. 1906–1976)

Norman John Rees, (c. 1906 – February 29, 1976) was an Italian-American oil engineer who was an agent for Soviet intelligence, then became a double agent for the FBI. Rees committed suicide when a newspaper revealed his spying activities.

== Early life and career ==
Rees was born Nuncio Ruisi in Sicily c. 1906. He worked as an engineer for the M.W. Kellogg Company and then the Socony Mobil Oil Company where he specialized in metallurgy, piping and pressurized tanks for oil.

== Patents ==
In 1956, Rees received credit for the co-patent of the gas lift.

== Spying ==
According to Rees, he became a "communist sympathizer" during World War II and began supplying oil industry trade secrets to the USSR in 1942. In 1950, he gave the Soviets a newly developed design for a catalytic cracking converter for which he earned a Soviet medal. In addition, he said he supplied Soviet agents with designs for a petroleum plant, natural gas processes and pressurized holding tanks. A newspaper report said he earned $30,000 over the years for providing information. After the FBI approached him about his activities, Rees worked as a double agent for the FBI from 1971 to 1975.

== Exposure and death ==
In 1976, during a three-month-long investigation, the Dallas Times Herald newspaper twice flew Rees to Dallas for interviews. After the investigative journalist Kenneth P. Johnson told Rees that the newspaper planned to print a story that would expose his activity as a double agent, Rees asked Johnson not to run the story or else Rees would commit suicide. Ten hours after the story was published, Rees died from a self-inflicted gunshot wound. In the aftermath, newspapers debated whether the threat of suicide should supersede the right of the journalist to publish the story.
