= Water eductor =

Type of pump used in archeology

A water eductor or water dredge is an eductor-jet pump-based tool used by underwater archaeologists to remove sediments from an underwater archaeological site. Airlifts may be used for the same purpose.

Archaeologists preparing a water dredge on a shallow site

It consists of a large bore straight tube to which is attached a hose pipe through which clean water is pumped. The Bernoulli effect from the flow of pumped water causes suction at the mouth of the dredge. Water and sediment are sucked from the excavation site and released from the far end of the tube. The tube can be made of any rigid material such as steel or plastic. The diameter of the tube depends on the power available from the pump and whether delicate work is required.

In the hands of a trained archaeologist, the water dredge performs the same function as a wheelbarrow on land. It is used to carry away sediments, not to dig holes. The archaeologist dislodges the material using a trowel, brush or by making a fanning motion with the hand to cause a current to dislodge sediment. The archaeologist can also place overburden material directly into the mouth of the dredge. As the water dredge will remove particles held in suspension in the water, provided it is used correctly it will improve visibility in the immediate area of the excavation. Careful use of the water dredge ensures that artifacts can be recorded in context and features and stratigraphy can be studied.

Using a water dredge or airlift, the underwater archaeologist has an advantage over terrestrial counterparts, as the spoil is removed without effort and without needing to be transported across other parts of the archaeological site.

Where there is a possibility of small artifacts being missed because of poor visibility, a trap may be used at the outlet so that the lifted sediment can be filtered.

Water eductors are also used by marine treasure hunters to suck sediments for filtering for buried artifacts. Using the water dredge to directly suck sediments means that archaeological information on context and stratigraphy is not recorded.

An eductor can also form part of a wet scrubber system which are designed to remove soluble gases and particulate by inducing a gas flow using high pressure liquid focused into a venturi throat. Additionally, eductor scrubbers can be used for direct-contact condensation.

== See also ==
- Airlift pump
- Aspirator (pump)
- Gas lift
