= Moislains =

- Commune
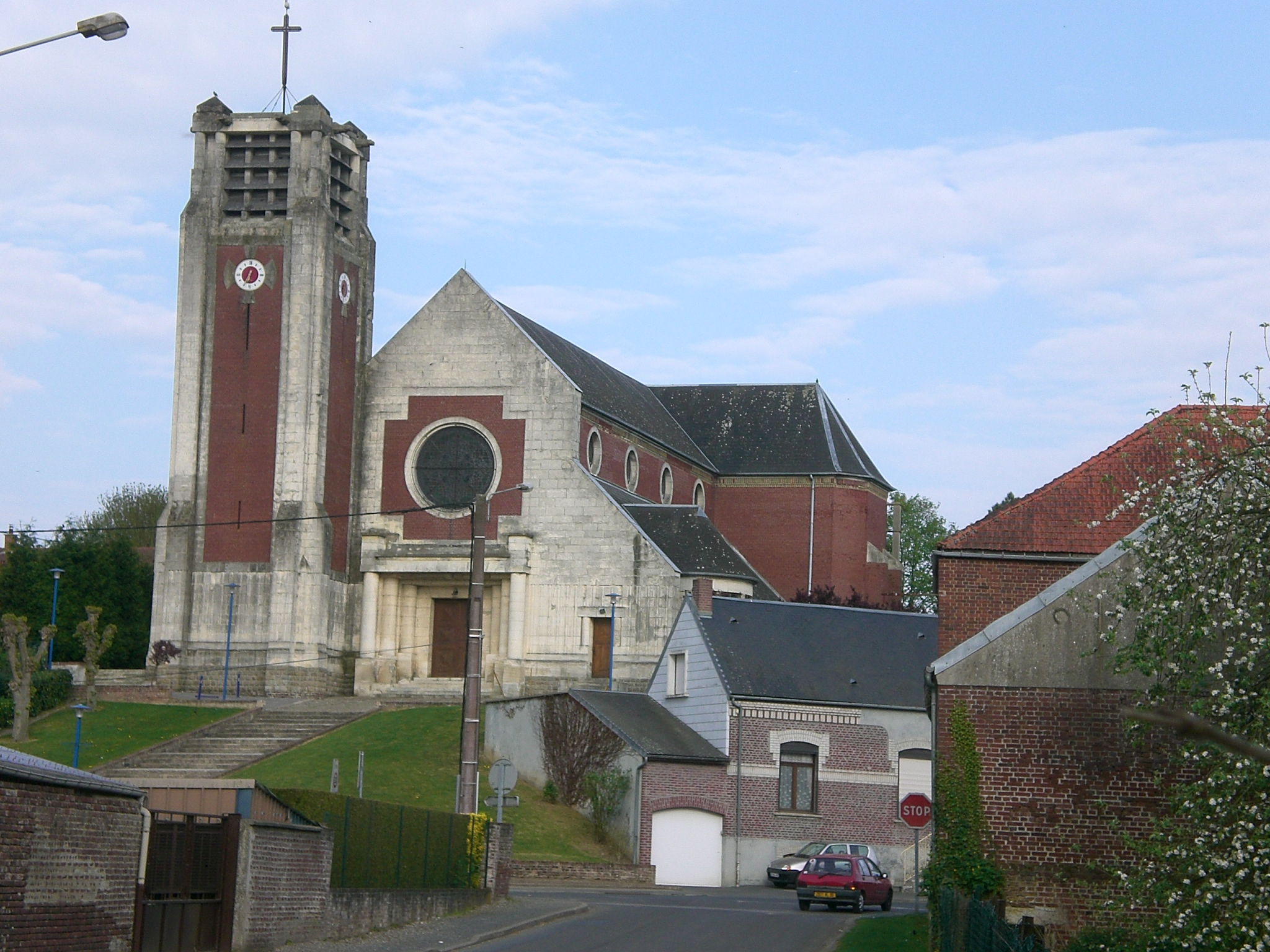
- The church in Moislains
- Location of Moislains
- Location within France Location within Hauts-de-France
- Coordinates: 49°59′26″N 2°57′53″E
- Country: France
- Region: Hauts-de-France
- Department: Somme
- Arrondissement: Péronne
- Canton: Péronne
- Intercommunality: Haute Somme

Government
  - Mayor (2020–2026): Noël Magnier
- Area^{1}: 20.62 km^{2} (7.96 sq mi)
- Elevation: 70 m (230 ft)
- Highest elevation: 152 m (499 ft)
- Lowest elevation: 62 m (203 ft)
- Population (2023): 1,109
  - Density: 53.78/km^{2} (139.3/sq mi)
- Time zone: UTC+01:00 (CET)
  - Summer (DST): UTC+02:00 (CEST)
- INSEE/Postal code: 80552 /80200
- ^{1} French Land Register data, which excludes lakes, ponds, glaciers > 1 km^{2} (0.386 sq mi or 247 acres) and river estuaries.

Moislains (French pronunciation: [mwalɛ̃]) is a commune in the Somme department in Hauts-de-France in northern France.

== Geography ==
Moislains is situated on the D184 and D43 crossroads, some 20 miles (32 km) northwest of Saint-Quentin.

== Population ==
Historical population
Year	Pop.	±% p.a.
1968	1,579	—
1975	1,464	−1.07%
1982	1,434	−0.30%
1990	1,376	−0.51%
1999	1,366	−0.08%
2007	1,316	−0.47%
2012	1,228	−1.37%
2017	1,201	−0.44%
2023	1,109	−1.32%
Source: INSEE

== Personalities ==
Ferdinand Carré, engineer, was born at Moislains in 1824.

== See also ==
- Communes of the Somme department
