= Gas lift =

Raising a fluid by introducing bubbles of gas into the outlet tube

A gas lift or bubble pump is a type of pump that can raise fluid between elevations by introducing gas bubbles into a vertical outlet tube; as the bubbles rise within the tube they cause a drop in the hydrostatic pressure behind them, causing the fluid to be pulled up. Gas lifts are commonly used as artificial lifts for water or oil, using compressed air or water vapor.

Gas lifts have been used for a variety of applications:

- Coffee percolators and electric drip coffeemakers use vaporized water to lift hot water
- Airlift pumps use compressed air to lift water
- Pulser pumps use a subterranean air chamber to lift underground water
- Suction dredges use a variety of the gas lift called an airlift pump to vacuum mud, sand and debris
- Mist lifts use vaporized water to draw seawater in ocean thermal energy conversion systems

== Petroleum industry uses ==
Model of a gas lift for pumping oil out of a well.

In the United States, gas lift is used in 10% of the oil wells that have insufficient reservoir pressure to produce the well. In the petroleum industry, the process involves injecting gas through the tubing-casing annulus. Injected gas aerates the fluid to reduce its density; the formation pressure is then able to lift the oil column and forces the fluid out of the wellbore. Gas may be injected continuously or intermittently, depending on the producing characteristics of the well and the arrangement of the gas-lift equipment.

The amount of gas to be injected to maximize oil production varies based on well conditions and geometries. Too much or too little injected gas will result in less than maximum production. Generally, the optimal amount of injected gas is determined by well tests, where the rate of injection is varied and liquid production (oil and perhaps water) is measured. Alternatively, mathematical models can be used to estimate the optimum gas injection rate. Such models offer significant economic benefit, since they allow one to simulate the performance of an actual or planned gas-lifted well using a digital replica of the well.

Although the gas is recovered from the oil at a later separation stage, the process requires energy to drive a compressor to raise the pressure of the gas to a level where it can be re-injected.

The gas-lift mandrel is a device installed in the tubing string of a gas-lift well onto which or into which a gas-lift valve is fitted. There are two common types of mandrels. In a conventional gas-lift mandrel, a gas-lift valve is installed as the tubing is placed in the well. Thus, to replace or repair the valve, the tubing string must be pulled. In the side-pocket mandrel, however, the valve is installed and removed by wireline while the mandrel is still in the well, eliminating the need to pull the tubing to repair or replace the valve.

A gas-lift valve is a device installed on (or in) a gas-lift mandrel, which in turn is put on the production tubing of a gas-lift well. Tubing and casing pressures cause the valve to open and close, thus allowing gas to be injected into the fluid in the tubing to cause the fluid to rise to the surface. In the lexicon of the industry, gas-lift mandrels are said to be "tubing retrievable" wherein they are deployed and retrieved attached to the production tubing. See gas-lift mandrel.

Gas lift operation can be optimized in different ways. The newest way is using risk-optimization which considers all aspects for gas lift allocation.

== History ==
Invented by Norman J. Rees and Albert W Zeuthen in 1956, Current Assignee ExxonMobil Oil Corp. Air lift uses compressed air to lift water in operations such as dredging and underwater archeology. It is also found in aquariums to keep water circulating. These forms of lift were used as far back as 1797 in mines to lift water from mine shafts. These systems used single point injection of air into the liquid stream, normally through a foot valve at the bottom of the string. Gas lift was used as early as 1864 in Pennsylvania to lift oil wells, also using compressed air, via an air pipe bringing the air to the bottom of the well. Air was used in Texas for large-scale artificial lift. In 1920 natural gas replaced air, lowering the risk of explosion. From 1929 until 1945 about 25000 patents were issued on different types of gas lift valves that could be used for unloading in stages. Some of these systems involved moving the tubing, or using wireline sinker bars to change the lift point. Others were spring operated valves. Ultimately, in 1944 W.R. King patented the pressurized bellows valve that is used today. In 1951 the sidepocket mandrel was developed for selectively positioning and retrieving gas lift valves with wireline.

== See also ==
- Pumpjack – Drive for a reciprocating piston pump in an oil well
- Progressive cavity pump – Type of rotary pump with helical rotor
- Submersible pump – Pump designed to work submerged in fluid
