= Airlift (dredging device) =

Dredging device using injected air to move water and entrained load up a pipe

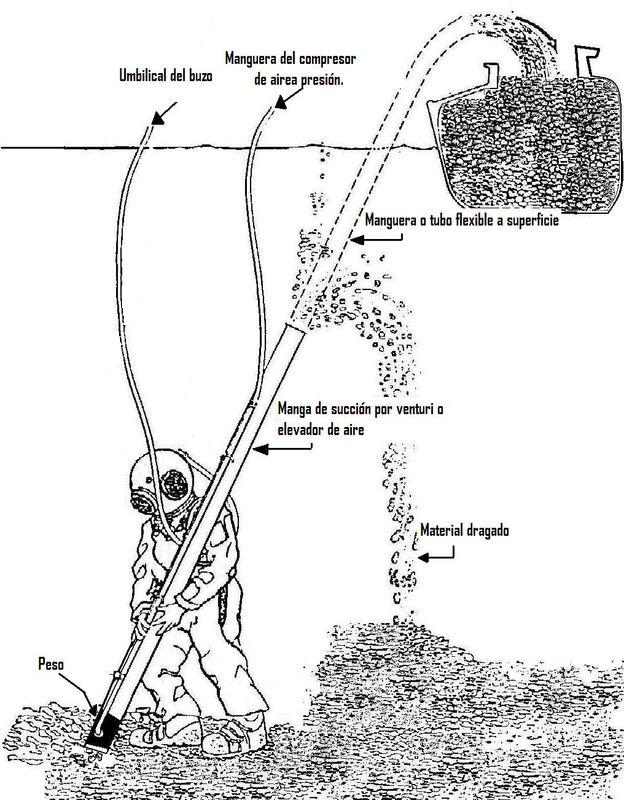
Airlift dredging

An airlift is device based on a pipe, used in nautical archaeology to suck small objects, sand and mud from the sea bed and to transport the resulting debris upwards and away from its source. It is a type of suction dredge. A water dredge or water eductor may be used for the same purpose.

Typically, the airlift is constructed from a 3-metre to 10 metre long, 10 cm diameter pipe. A controllable compressed air supply vents into the inside, lower end of the pipe (The input end always being the lower end). Compressed air is injected into the pipe in one to three second bursts with an interval long enough to let the resulting bubble to rise to the higher, output end of the pipe. The bubble moves water through the pipe sucking debris from the lower end and depositing it from the upper end of the pipe. Ejected debris can be either cast off (as in simply removing overburden) or collected in a mesh cage for inspection (as more often is the case in nautical archaeology). It is often designed to be hand-operated by a diver.

Airlift pumps are used by water utilities, farmers and others to extract water from deep wells. In such cases the pipes can be 30, 60 or more meters deep underground. Airlift pumps are governed by the physics of two-phase flow.

== See also ==
- Airlift pump – Pump using density difference due to injected air in the liquid
- Gas lift – Raising a fluid by introducing bubbles of gas into the outlet tube
