= Steam jet cooling =

Use of high-pressure steam jets to cool fluids

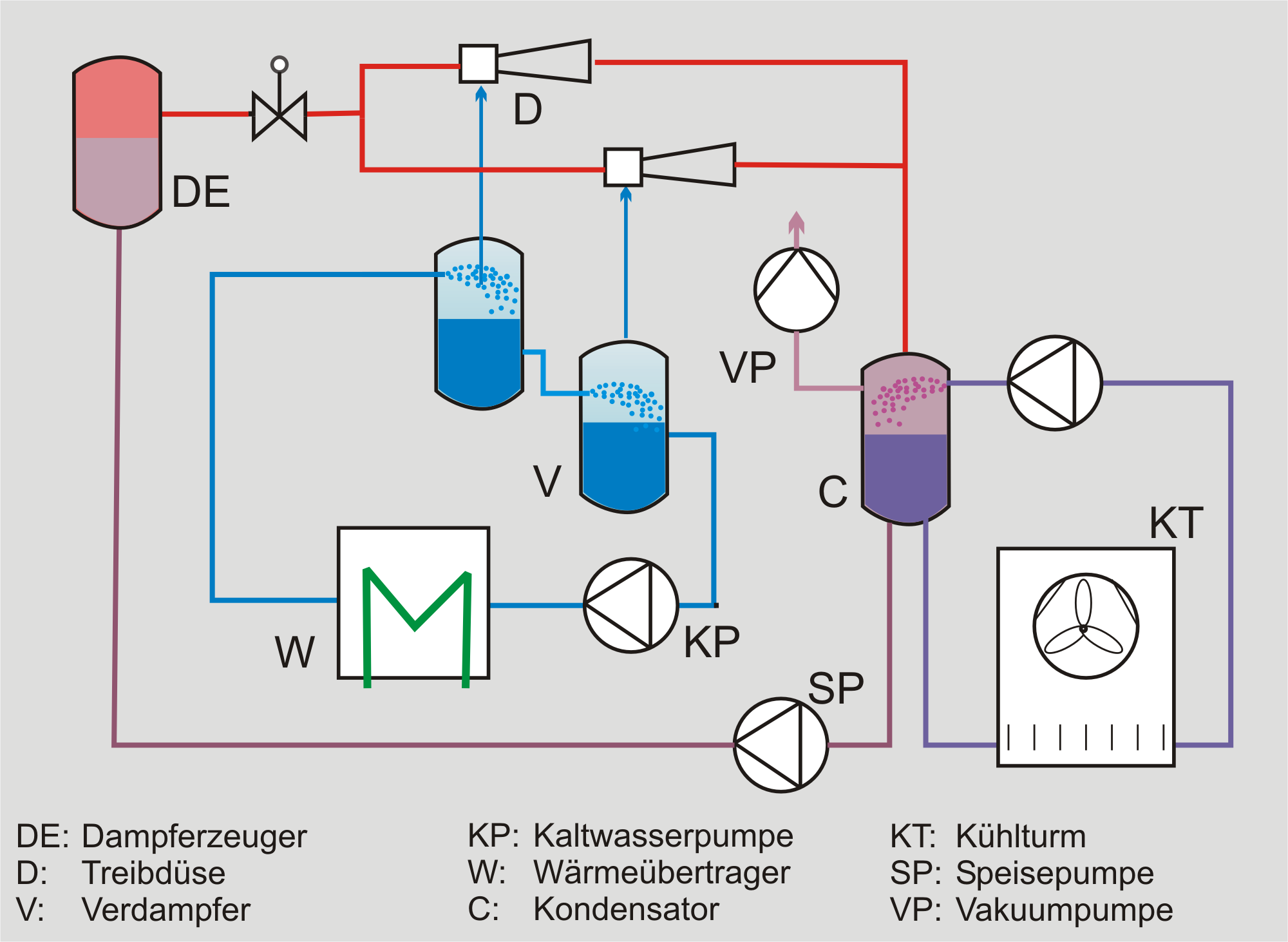
Two-stage steam-jet refrigeration system

Steam jet cooling uses a high-pressure jet of steam to cool water or other fluid media. Typical uses include industrial sites, where a suitable steam supply already exists for other purposes or, historically, for air conditioning on passenger trains which use steam for heating. Steam jet cooling experienced a wave of popularity during the early 1930s for air conditioning large buildings. Steam ejector refrigeration cycles were later supplanted by systems using mechanical compressors.

== Principle ==
Steam is passed through a vacuum ejector of high efficiency to exhaust a separate, closed vessel which forms part of a cooling water circuit. The partial vacuum in the vessel causes some of the water to evaporate, thus giving up heat through evaporative cooling. The chilled water is pumped through the circuit to air coolers, while the evaporated water from the ejector is recovered in separate condensers and returned to the cooling circuit.

== Usage ==
The AT&SF railroad (Santa Fe) used this method, which they called "Steam Ejector Air Conditioning", on both heavyweight and lightweight passenger cars, built until the mid-1950s.

== See also ==
- Steam jet ejector
- Injector or Ejector
