= Vacuum ejector =

Type of ejector-jet pump

Aspirator
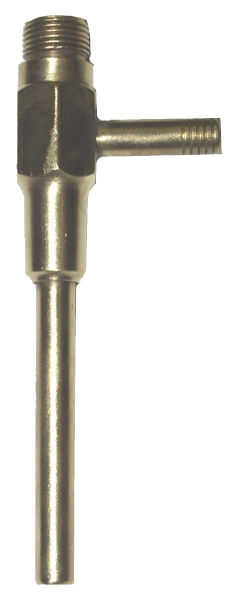
- A brass aspirator. The water inlet and outlet are at the top and bottom, respectively; the air inlet is on the side.
- Other names: Eductor-jet pump, injector/ejector, filter pump, Venturi pump
- Uses: Vacuum generation, suction
- Related items: Injector, vacuum pump

A vacuum ejector, or simply ejector, or aspirator, is a type of vacuum pump, which produces vacuum by means of the Venturi effect.

In an ejector, a working fluid (liquid or gaseous) flows through a jet nozzle into a tube that first narrows and then expands in cross-sectional area. The fluid leaving the jet is flowing at a high velocity which due to Bernoulli's principle results in it having low pressure, thus generating a vacuum. The outer tube then narrows into a mixing section where the high velocity working fluid mixes with the fluid that is drawn in by the vacuum, imparting enough velocity for it to be ejected, the tube then typically expands in order to decrease the velocity of the ejected stream, allowing the pressure to smoothly increase to the external pressure.

The strength of the vacuum produced depends on the velocity and shape of the fluid jet and the shape of the constriction and mixing sections, but if a liquid is used as the working fluid, the strength of the vacuum produced is limited by the vapor pressure of the liquid (for water, 3.2 kPa or 0.46 psi or 32 mbar at 25 °C or 77 °F). If a gas is used, however, this restriction does not exist.

If not considering the source of the working fluid, vacuum ejectors can be significantly more compact than a self-powered vacuum pump of the same capacity.

== Common types ==
=== Water aspirator ===
The cheap and simple water aspirator is commonly used in chemistry and biology laboratories and consists of a tee fitting attached to a tap and has a hose barb at one side. The flow of water passes through the straight portion of the tee, which has a restriction at the intersection, where the hose barb is attached. The vacuum hose should be connected to this barb. In the past, water aspirators were common for low-strength vacuums in chemistry benchwork. However, they are water-intensive, and depending on what the vacuum is being used for (e.g. solvent removal), they can violate environmental protection laws such as the RCRA by mixing potentially hazardous chemicals into the water stream, then flushing them down a drain that often leads directly to the municipal sewer. Their use has decreased somewhat as small electric vacuum pumps are far more effective, environmentally safe, and have become more affordable, but the unmatched simplicity and reliability of this device have caused it to remain popular for small labs or as a backup.

Another, much larger version of this device is used in maritime operations as a device to dewater (drain) areas in a ship that have been flooded in emergency situations. Typically referred to as an eductor in these applications, this is preferred over electrical pumps due to their simplicity, compact size, and greatly mitigated risk of explosion in the event that flammable liquids and/or vapors are present. Additionally, unlike many mechanical pumps, they can also pass debris as the eductor has no moving parts that can be fouled. This makes an eductor especially useful in situations where fitting a debris strainer to the suction port will present more issues than it resolves. The size of the debris that can be passed depends on the physical size of the eductor. Sizes, flow ratings, and applications vary, including eductors that are permanently installed (typically used in very large spaces, such as a ship's main engine room), or portable models that can be lowered into spaces by a rope and supplied and drained through firefighting hoses. Most are supplied through a ship's firefighting main, and portable models can also be supplied by an emergency pump, provided it can supply sufficient flow to operate the eductor.

=== Steam ejector ===
The industrial steam ejector (also called the "steam jet ejector", "steam aspirator", or "evactor") uses steam as a working fluid and multistage systems can produce very high vacuums. Due to the lack of delicate moving parts and the flow of steam providing somewhat of cleaning action, steam ejectors can handle gas flows containing liquids, dust, or even solid particles that would damage or clog many other vacuum pumps. Ejectors made entirely from specialised materials such as PTFE or graphite have allowed usage of extremely corrosive gases, since steam ejectors have no moving parts they can be constructed in their entirety from almost any material that has sufficient durability.

In order to avoid using too much steam or impractical operating pressures, a single steam-ejector stage is generally not used to generate vacuum below approximately 10 kPa (75 mmHg). To generate higher vacuum, multiple stages are used; in a two-stage steam ejector, for example, the second stage provides vacuum for the waste steam output by the first stage. Condensers are typically used between stages to significantly reduce the load on the later stages. Steam ejectors with two, three, four, five and six stages may be used to produce vacuums down to 2.5 kPa, 300 Pa, 40 Pa, 4 Pa, and 0.4 Pa, respectively.

Steam ejectors are also suitable for pumping many liquids since if the steam can be easily condensed into the liquid then there is no need to separate the working fluid or manage a mist of liquid droplets. This is the manner in which a steam injector operates.

An additional use for the injector technology is in vacuum ejectors in continuous train braking systems, which were made compulsory in the UK by the Regulation of Railways Act 1889. A vacuum ejector uses steam pressure to draw air out of the vacuum pipe and reservoirs of continuous train brake. Steam locomotives, with a ready source of steam, found ejector technology ideal with its rugged simplicity and lack of moving parts. A steam locomotive usually has two ejectors: a large ejector for releasing the brakes when stationary and a small ejector for maintaining the vacuum against leaks. The exhaust from the ejectors is invariably directed to the smokebox, by which means it assists the blower in draughting the fire. The small ejector is sometimes replaced by a reciprocating pump driven from the crosshead because this is more economical of steam and is only required to operate when the train is moving.

=== Air ejector ===
Commonly called an air ejector, Venturi pump, or vacuum ejector. This ejector is similar in operation to the steam ejector but uses high-pressure air as the working fluid. Multistage air ejectors can be used, but since air cannot easily be condensed at room temperature, an air ejector is usually limited to two stages as each subsequent stage would have to be significantly larger than the last. These are commonly used in pneumatic handling equipment when a small vacuum is required to pick up objects since compressed air is often already present to power other parts of the equipment. Air ejectors used to suction liquids directly will produce a fine mist of droplets, this is how airbrushes and many other spraying systems operate, but when a spray is not required it is typically an undesirable effect that limits the applications to gas suction.

The basic elements of an ejector

== See also ==
- Deaerator
- Diffusion pump
- Injector
- Vacuum pump
- Water eductor
