= Frizell =

Frizell may refer to:

== People ==
- Joseph Palmer Frizell (1832–1910), American engineer
- Lisa Frizell, American politician
- Shannon Frizell (born 1994), Tongan-born New Zealand rugby union player
- Sultana Frizell (born 1984), Canadian track and field athlete
- Tyson Frizell (born 1991), Australian rugby league footballer

== Other uses ==
- Frizell, Kansas
- Dr. Frizell House, house in Arkansas
