= Surge tank =

Water storage device to smooth pressure variations

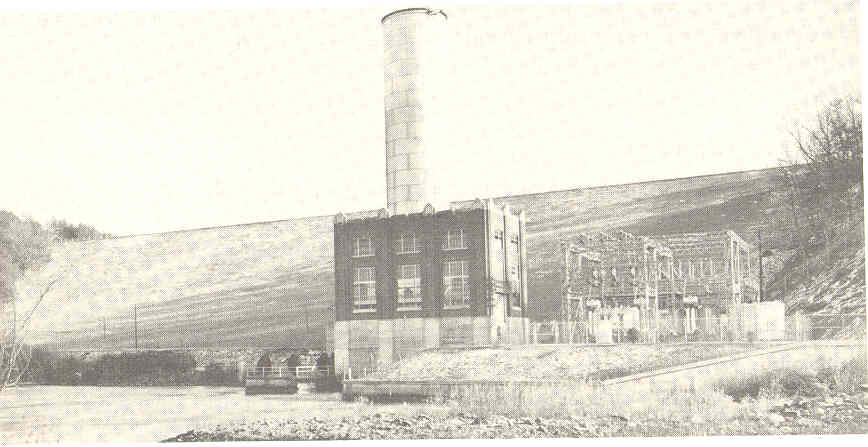
The Blue Ridge Dam and surge tank

A surge tank (or surge drum or surge pool) is a standpipe or storage reservoir at the downstream end of a closed aqueduct, feeder pipe, or dam to absorb sudden rises of pressure, as well as to quickly provide extra water during a brief drop in pressure.

In mining technology, ore pulp pumps use a relatively small surge tank to maintain a steady loading on the pump.

For hydroelectric power uses, a surge tank is an additional storage space or reservoir fitted between the main storage reservoir and the powerhouse (as close to the powerhouse as possible). Surge tanks are usually provided in high or medium-head plants when there is a considerable distance between the water source and the power unit, necessitating a long penstock. The main functions of the surge tank are:

- When the load decreases, the water moves backward and gets stored in it.
- When the load increases, the additional supply of water will be provided by a surge tank.
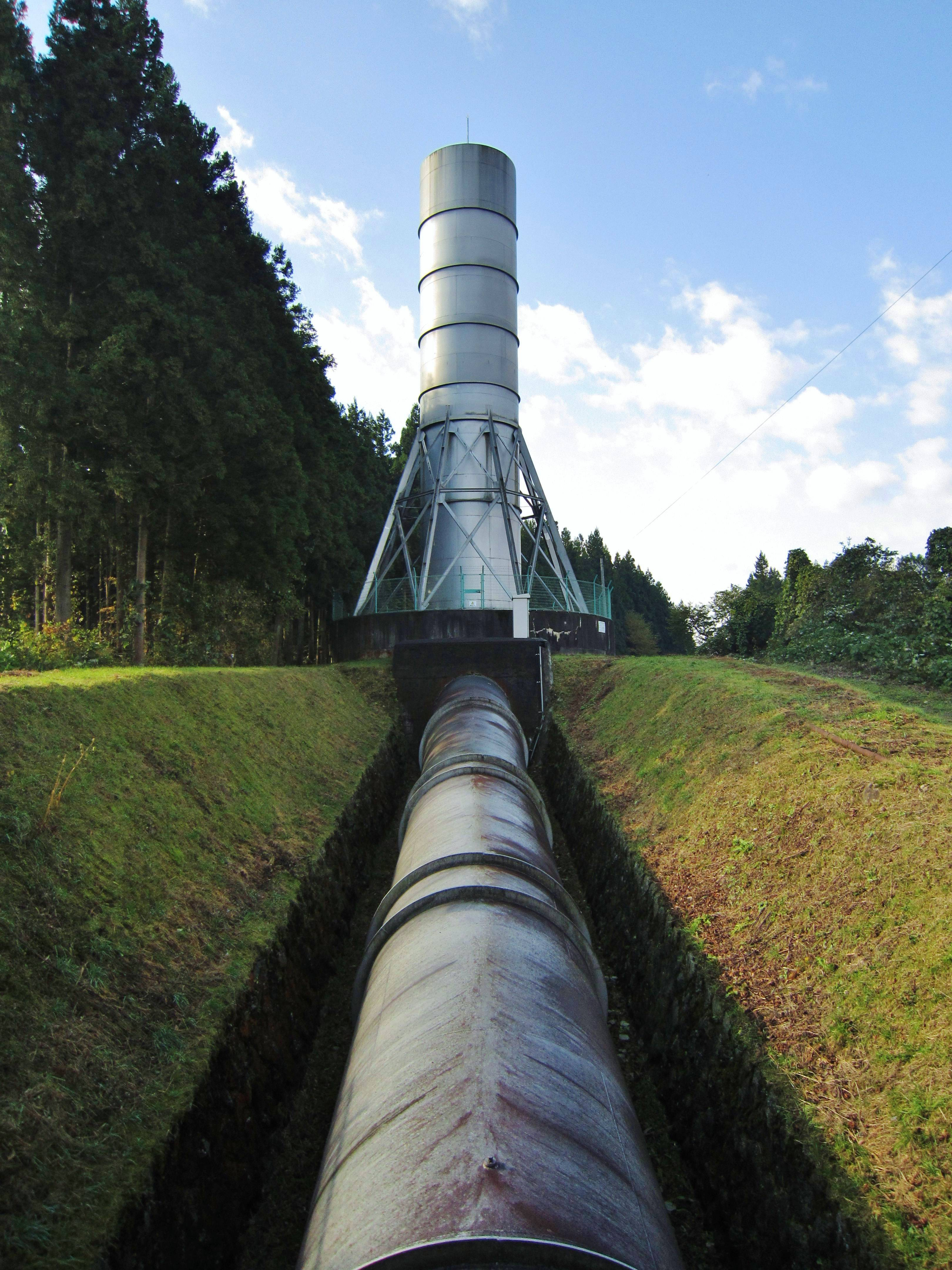
  Isawa II power station surge tank

== Operation ==
Consider a pipe containing a flowing fluid. When a valve is either fully or partially closed at some point downstream, the fluid will continue to flow at the original velocity. In order to counteract the momentum of the fluid, the pressure will rise significantly (pressure surge) just upstream of the control valve and may result in damage to the pipe system. If a surge chamber is connected to the pipeline just upstream of the valve, on valve closure, the fluid, instead of being stopped suddenly by the valve, will flow upwards into the chamber, hence reducing the surge pressures experienced in the pipeline.

Upon closure of the valve, the fluid continues to flow, passing into the surge tank causing the water level in the tank to rise. The level in the tank will continue to rise until the additional head due to the height of fluid in the tank balances the surge pressure in the pipeline. At this point the flow in the tank and pipeline will reverse causing the level in the tank to drop. This oscillation in tank height and flow will continue for some time but its magnitude will dissipate due to the effects of friction.

== Automotive surge tanks ==
The surge tank is utilized in automotive applications to ensure that the inlet to the fuel pump is never starved for fuel. It is typically used in vehicles with electronic fuel injection or that will be sustaining high lateral acceleration loads for extended periods.

== Aircraft surge tanks ==
Aircraft surge tanks are used on a select few aircraft to ensure that fuel does not spill over onto the ground when the fuel expands. These tanks must be periodically emptied to prevent fuel from spilling, which they do fairly often.

== See also ==
- Hydraulic accumulator – Reservoir to store and stabilise fluid pressure
- Hydropneumatic device
- Water hammer – Pressure surge when a fluid is forced to stop or change direction suddenly
- Water tower – Elevated structure supporting a tank
