= Impulse oscillometry =

Lung function test measuring effect of pressure oscillation on airflow

Impulse oscillometry (IOS), also known as respiratory oscillometry, forced oscillatory technique (FOT), or just oscillometry, is a non-invasive lung function test that measures the mechanical properties of the respiratory system, particularly the upper and intrathoracic airways, lung tissue and chest wall, usually during the patient's tidal breathing (the way someone breathes when they are relaxed).

== Principle ==
Impulse oscillometry measures the mechanical impedance of the respiratory system (Z_{rs}), which encompasses the resistance of the respiratory system to flow (R_{rs}), the reactance or stiffness of the lung parenchyma in response to changes in volume (X_{rs}) and the inertance of accelerating gas in the airways (I_{rs}).

The following relations hold between these parameters: $Z_{rs}=R_{rs}+iX_{rs}$, where $i$ is the imaginary unit ($\sqrt{-1}$), and $X_{rs} = \omega I_{rs} - \frac{E_{rs}}{\omega}$, where $E_{rs}$ is the airway elastance and $\omega$ is the angular velocity such that $\omega=2 \pi f$, where $f$ is the frequency of the stimulus oscillation.

Z_{rs} is measured by comparing the magnitudes of mechanical stimuli, specifically oscillations of pressure, i.e. pressure waves, transmitted into the respiratory system with the magnitudes of the stimuli's effects on tidal airflow; this is done by superimposing these oscillations over spontaneous tidal breathing.

=== Stimulation ===
The stimulus is an oscillation of pressure of a particular frequency that is transmitted to the lungs of the patient. This is usually done by mouth, though the direct stimulation of the chest wall is also possible. These pressure waves cause changes in the airflow during tidal breathing; the magnitudes of the pressure waves and the changes in airflow they cause are then used to determine the airways' mechanical impedance.

Frequencies ranging from 4-50 Hz are commonly generated by a loudspeaker, while frequencies between 0.5 and 4 Hz may alternatively also be generated by a piston or pneumatic proportional solenoid valves.

Different frequencies measure the mechanical properties of different parts of the respiratory system; the resistance at 5 Hz (R_{5}) represents total airway resistance, while the resistance at 20 Hz (R_{20}) represents the resistance of the central airways. The reactance at 5 Hz (X_{5}) reflects the elasticity of the peripheral airways.

=== Example of clinical application ===
- Asthma: In adults, oscillometry can aid in the diagnosis of asthma and also asses the severity of airway obstruction.
