= Alternative Indigenous Development Foundation =

Nonprofit organization in the Philippines

Alternative Indigenous Development Foundation, Inc is a non-profit organisation that helps with upland irrigation for farmers in the Philippines. It was awarded the Ramon Magsaysay Award in 2011.

== History ==
The foundation was formed in 1991 by Auke Idzenga, Leonidas Baterna, Gina Veloria, and Edmund Villorosa, who worked with sugar workers in Bacolod City. Originally, it was a labor union which supported sugar workers who had participated in the government's new agrarian reform program. Idzenga, Baterna, Veloria, and Villorosa founded the organization when they observed the issue of the "inaccessibility of supply of potable water and irrigation experienced by rural upland communities." Idzenga, who was a marine engineer, developed the hydraulic ram pump as a solution.
