= Hydropneumatic device =

Hydropneumatic devices (or hydro-pneumatic devices) are systems that operate using water and gas to store energy, or amplify mechanical force. The devices are used in various applications which include pressure booster systems for high-rise buildings, shock absorbing accumulators in industrial machinery, and heavy-duty presses.

== Description ==
A hydropneumatic device is a tool that functions by using water and gas. Hydropneumatic refers to the pneumatic (gas) and hydraulic (water) components needed for operation of the devices.

Hydropneumatic accumulators or pulsation dampeners are devices which prevent, but do not absorb, alleviate, arrest, attenuate, or suppress a shock that already exists, meaning that these devices prevent the creation of a shock wave at an otherwise earlier stage. These can include pulsation dampeners, hydropneumatic accumulators, water hammer preventers, water hammer arrestors, and other things.

== Devices ==
=== Hydropneumatic water hammer preventers ===
Hydropneumatic water hammer preventers are chambers of sufficient volume to allow an extension of time in which a given flow may be accelerated or decelerated without sudden large change in pressure. See also expansion tank. When shock waves of an incompressible fluid within a piping system exist, especially at a high velocity, there is a high chance for water hammer. To help prevent a swing check from slamming and causing water hammer, a spring-assisted non-slam check valve is installed. Rather than relying on flow or gravity to be closed, the non-slam design prevents a sudden velocity decrease and reverse flow.

The hydropneumatic water hammer preventer chamber is generally adapted to contain a separator member which prevents the escape of a pre-filled compressed inert gas. They may be

1. Placed closely before a valve that is closed quickly. Stops water hammering.
2. Placed immediately after the discharge of a pump that is started fast into a pipe full of a long column of liquid. Reduces start up surge pressure.
3. Placed immediately after a pump, which when caused to stop suddenly, enables a vacuum to form, which pulls the flow back towards the pump. Prevents an implosion bang.

Variations on the design include

1. Having a separator membrane into the interior of which the liquid is communicated. Used for corrosive liquids, so that the chamber metal can be of low cost.
2. Having a metal bellows separator membrane for use at low and higher temperatures than are compatible with an elastomeric or plastomeric membrane.
3. Having a float separator to reduce the rate of gas absorption at the liquid interface, typically used in vessel chambers larger than 500 gallons.

=== Hydropneumatic pump controllers ===
Hydropneumatic pump controllers provide a

1. Means of control for multiple fixed delivery volume, low cost low complexity pumps; to provide variable flow as required by small (say +/- 10 psi) pressure increase or decrease of a system.
2. Means of control for pump unloading / recirculation against no pressure, without electric pressure switches.

The controllers are pressure cylinders containing a movable separator member between a gas and a liquid, said moveable member causing the actuation of directional control valve or valves. The controllers are used in a circuit after a pump that is followed by a valved-side branch, and beyond a check valve, so that this device can only discharge liquid volume by a pressure fall of the system.

Variations on the design include

1. Having a protruding drive rod, cams from which trip valve handles.
2. Having magnetically actuated reed switched.
3. Having infrared signaling of separator position.

=== Hydropneumatic pulsation filters ===
Hydropneumatic pulsation filters provide means of reducing the amplitude of pressure changes the velocity of which is in the order of 1.4 km/s. All are used in industry.

A hydropneumatic pulsation filter is a pressure container with separate inlet and outlet, connectable to a pipe system so that all pressure changes must attempt to pass through said chamber. Entry and exit of said chamber being of a diameter relative to chamber diameter that provides a high discharge coefficient, and without close proximity of any reflective surface. Lack of any sudden change in cross section area of flow path that would reflect a pressure wave, i.e. no orifice plate(s). Variations include Combination "dual purpose" devices addressing "acceleration head reduction" by means of a gas containment.

The devices have applications by frequency response

- For pulsation above frequency 100 Hz (i.e., for high speed pumps and all pipe systems shorter than say 80 yards): no moving parts devices.
- For pulsation frequencies below 100 Hz: certain moving parts devices of known membrane response characteristics.

=== Hydropneumatic acceleration head reducers ===
Hydropneumatic acceleration head reducers minimize the mass of liquid that has to be accelerated when flow velocity changes. Within a piping system, pressure rises when a volume of fluid becomes present. This acceleration head needs to be reduced to prevent damage to pump components and excessive noise. These devices are typically mountable in any orientation such that the device is connectable directly to the suction check valve beneath the pump or directly to any vertical or horizontal discharge check valve; minimizing the length of any liquid column mass that will experience velocity change. Pump connection being separate from system connection so that no acceleration head changes occur due to reciprocation within one port.

Applications for hydropneumatic acceleration head reducers include

1. Reduction in drive energy costs required by any pump.
2. Reduction in pipe diameter and schedule (wall thickness) costs of any pipe system.
3. Decrease in fatigue and increase in safety of all pressure piping systems.
4. Increase in accuracy and automatability of all pressure and flow control instruments.
5. Increase in rotating equipment life and MTBF.
6. Reduction in service down time.

Variations on the design include

1. For chemicals and process pump systems: having PTFE membranes.
2. For sludges and slurries: having a clear unobstructed flow path direct from in to out.
3. For general purposes: having an elastomeric bladder separator.

=== Pulsation dampeners ===
==== Misuse of the term ====
Some manufacturers of pulsation dampeners provide items which do not dampen pulsations. The compressibility of a gas, often nitrogen because it is inert at normal temperatures, stores any sudden volume change. Storing sudden volume change enables volume to change against a soft gas cushion, without the need to accelerate all the existing liquid in the system out of the way of the new volume coming from a pump. Therefore, as all the volume in a system does not have to be suddenly accelerated, the cushion is preventing "acceleration head" (force) having to be generated. The pressure pulse is accordingly not generated in the first place, so it is not dampened at all. The gas cushion simply allows volume change to be stored. The manufacturers are providing, are liquid accumulators, not an item which removes energy.

=== Hydropneumatic accumulators ===
Gas cushion (spring) pre-filled accumulators of liquids are called hydropneumatic accumulators. "Hydro" because a liquid (like water) is involved. "Pneumatic" because a gas (like air) is involved. "Accumulator" because the purpose is to store or accumulate liquid volume by easy compression of the gas. These devices are typified by having only one liquid connection that goes to a "T" on the system.

==== Non-hydropneumatic ====
There are other forms of accumulator used for fluid power hydraulic purposes. For example, coil spring plus sealed piston; though these are less popular. Therefore, a hydraulic accumulator is not necessarily a hydropneumatic accumulator.
