= Lorenzo Allievi =

Italian engineer (1856–1941)

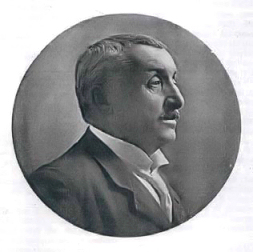
- Lorenzo Allievi
- Born: November 18, 1856; Milan, Austrian Empire
- Died: October 30, 1941 (aged 84); Rome, Italy
- Known for: water hammer studies
- Scientific career
- Fields: Electrical engineer

Lorenzo Allievi (November 18, 1856 – October 30, 1941) was an Italian engineer known for being one of the first to explain the water hammer problem.

== Biography ==
Allievi was born in Milan but moved with his family to Rome in 1871. There he graduated in 1879. He worked in Naples from 1893 to 1901 as CEO of Rinascimento di Napoli. Then he came back to the Rome area and started working in the Terni steel/chemical/hydroelectric industrial district. In August 1902, when maintenance was being carried out on the hydroelectrical power plant of Papigno (Terni), the closure of a water pipe caused its explosion and great damage to the plant. Allievi investigated the problem immediately thereafter and published his fundamental study on the water hammer problem the same year. He continued to study this problem in the following years while still working on hydroelectric power plants and becoming vice president of the Union of Industrials (in Italy). Allievi wrote in 1895 a booklet titled Cinematica della Biella Piana (Tipografia Francesco Giannini e Figli, Naples 1895) where a completely analytical solution to mechanisms design problems is given.

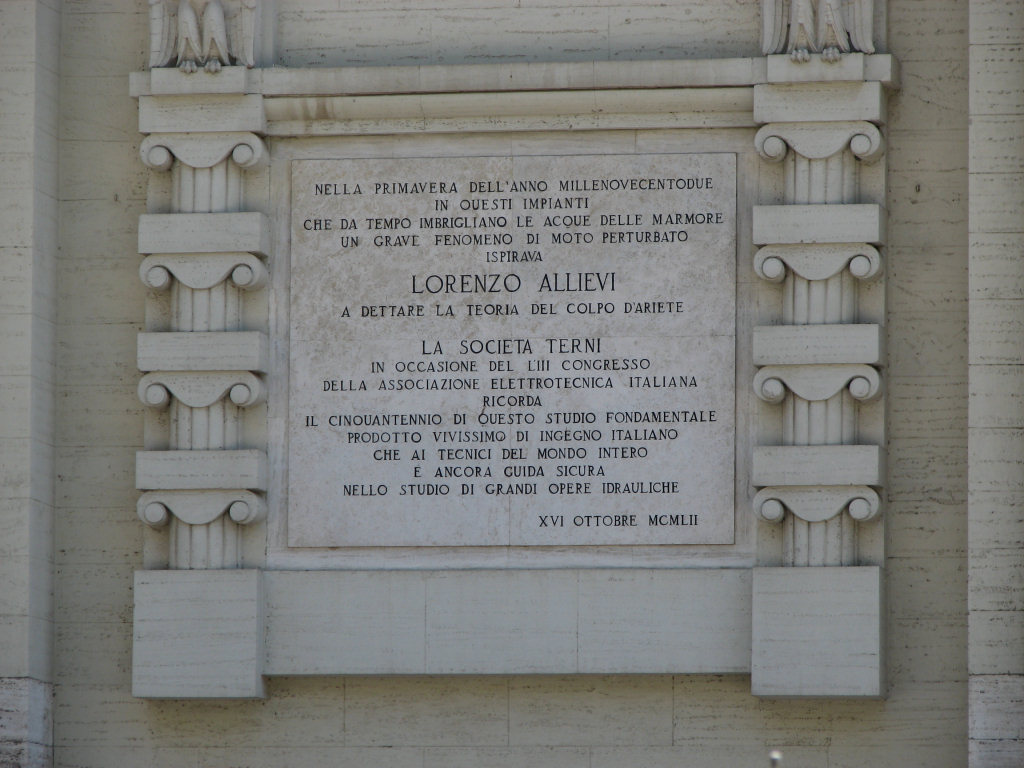
Lorenzo Allievi memorial plaque

Lorenzo Allievi died in Rome on October 30, 1941. In 1952, 50 years after the Terni incident, a large marble plaque was erected in his memory at the front of the Galleto hydroelectric power plant which, after World War II, had replaced that of Papigno.
