= Collapsing pulse =

Medical sign in aortic regurgitation

- Synonyms: Watson's hammer pulse; Corrigan's pulse
- Test of: aortic regurgitation

Watson's water hammer pulse, also known as Corrigan's pulse or collapsing pulse, is the medical sign (seen in aortic regurgitation) which describes a pulse that is bounding and forceful, rapidly increasing and subsequently collapsing, as if it were the sound of a water hammer that was causing the pulse.

== Diagnosis ==
To feel a water hammer pulse: with the patient reclining, the examiner raises the patient's arm vertically upwards. The examiner grasps the muscular part of the patient's forearm. A water hammer pulse is felt as a tapping impulse that is transmitted through the bulk of the muscles. This happens because the blood that is pumped to the arm during systole is emptied very quickly due to the gravity effect on the raised arm. This results in the artery emptying back into the heart during diastole, increasing preload, and therefore increasing cardiac output, (as per the Frank–Starling mechanism) so that systolic blood pressure increases and a stronger pulse pressure can be palpated.

== Causes ==
Water hammer pulse is commonly found when a patient has aortic regurgitation. It can also be seen in other conditions which are associated with a hyperdynamic circulation. A more comprehensive list of causes follows:

- Physiological
  - Fever
  - Pregnancy
- Cardiac lesions
  - Aortic regurgitation
  - Patent ductus arteriosus
  - Systolic hypertension
  - Bradycardia
  - Aortopulmonary window
  - Aneurysm of sinus of Valsalva
- Syndromes or high-output states
  - Anemia
  - Cor pulmonale
  - Cirrhosis of liver
  - Beriberi
  - Thyrotoxicosis
  - Arteriovenous fistula
  - Paget's disease
- Other causes
  - Chronic alcoholism

== Eponym ==
"Watson's water hammer pulse" and "Corrigan's pulse" refer to similar observations. However, the former usually refers to measurement of a pulse on a limb, while the latter refers to measurement of the pulse of the carotid artery.

- "Corrigan's pulse" is named for Sir Dominic Corrigan, the Irish physician, who characterized it in 1832.
- "Watson's water hammer pulse" is named for Thomas Watson, who characterized it in 1844.

== See also ==
- Blood hammer
