= Jean Mercier (engineer) =

French American engineer, businessman (1901–1971)

Jean Mercier (1901–1971), a Frenchman, was known as the father of the bladder-type hydraulic accumulator. Mercier fled France for the United States during the Nazi invasion, eventually settling in New York City. After meeting Edward M. Greer in 1940, the two founded Greer Hydraulics (in 1942) to produce aircraft hydraulic components.

In 1943, Jean Mercier recognized an opportunity for his bladder type accumulators in Hamilton Standard's hydromatic propellers. They needed a device that would fit inside the dome of their propeller, and have the ability to store sufficient hydraulic fluid to "feather" the propeller on an engine failure that might be experienced in combat. It also had to be able to function at temperatures from −40 °F to +180 °F. There was a single insurmountable problem—weight, which was a problem since World War II aircraft were quite small. The use of a gas/oil separator, today called a bladder, solved the problem.

Greer and Mercier formed a patent company (Greer-Olaer) and Greer Hydraulics became the sole licensee, with the rights to continue development and to license other companies outside the U.S. From the early 1950s, bladder-type accumulators became the unit that was specified and used in almost every application where hydraulics was employed - machine tools, plastic machinery, circuit breakers, rock crushers, oil drilling, farm and road machinery, to name a few.

Greer Hydraulics was later acquired by Parker-Hannifin of Cleveland, Ohio.

Mercier was awarded the Franklin Institute's Certificate of Merit in 1951. He was also decorated Chevalier de la Legion d'honneur by the French Republic.
