= Wave method =

In fluid dynamics, the wave method (WM), or wave characteristic method (WCM), is a model describing unsteady flow of fluids in conduits (pipes).

== Details of model ==
The wave method is based on the physically accurate concept that transient pipe flow occurs as a result of pressure waves generated and propagated from a disturbance in the pipe system (valve closure, pump trip, etc.) This method was developed and first described by Don J. Wood in 1966. A pressure wave, which represents a rapid pressure and associated flow change, travels at sonic velocity for the liquid pipe medium, and the wave is partially transmitted and reflected at all discontinuities in the pipe system (pipe junctions, pumps, open or closed ends, surge tanks, etc.) A pressure wave can also be modified by pipe wall resistance. This description is one that closely represents the actual mechanism of transient pipe flow.

== Advantages ==
The WM has the very significant advantage that computations need be made only at nodes in the piping system. Other techniques such as the method of characteristics (MOC) require calculations at equally spaced interior points in a pipeline. This requirement can easily increase the number of calculations by a factor of 10 or more. However, virtually identical solutions are obtained by the WM and the MOC.

== See also ==
- EPANET
