= Waterwheel (McCoy, Colorado) =

- U.S. National Register of Historic Places
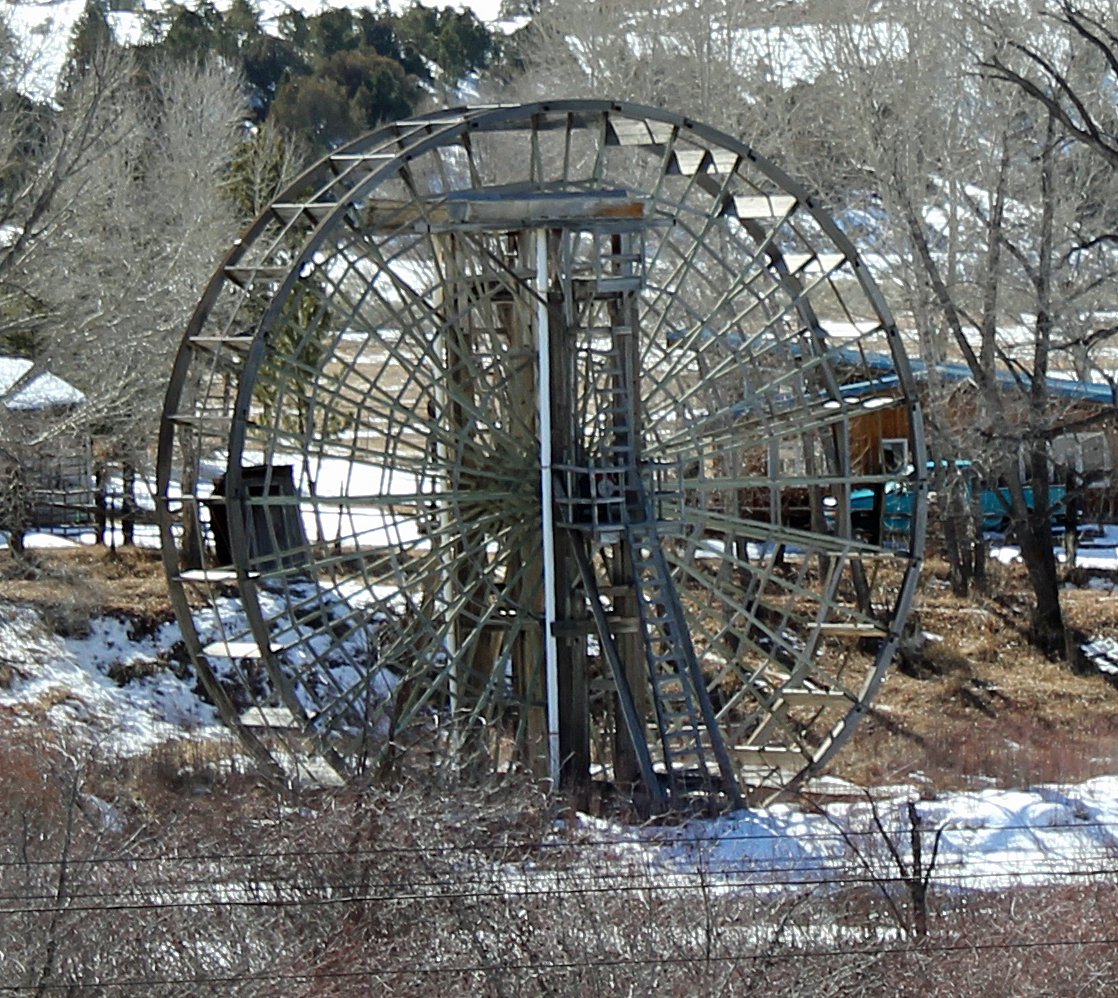

- Location within Colorado
- Nearest city: McCoy, Colorado
- Coordinates: 39.902786°N 106.717235°W
- Area: less than one acre
- Built: 1922
- NRHP reference No.: 77000372
- Added to NRHP: April 11, 1977

The Waterwheel, in Eagle County, Colorado, is a historic device to lift water from the Colorado River to a height where it may be distributed for irrigation. It was built in 1922. It is located southeast of McCoy, Colorado at the Colorado River. It was listed on the National Register of Historic Places in 1977, at a time when it was in deteriorated condition. It has since been rehabilitated by the Colorado Water Restoration Foundation, Ltd.

It stands 40 feet (12 m) high and is about 6 feet (1.8 m) wide. It was built of jackpine logs crafted by hand tools. It lifted water 32 feet (9.8 m) in 35 buckets around its perimeter, which emptied into a wooden trough that flowed into an irrigation ditch.

It could be raised out of the water in winter to avoid damage from ice, and lowered to an appropriate level to capture the river's flow.

It is significant as the last surviving water wheel out of many once in use on the Colorado River. It was built by Earl Brooks, a rancher, and Franklin Dixon and Jim Jones, without any formal design being available or produced.

== See also ==
- Priestly's Hydraulic Ram
- Idaho Springs Water Wheel, documented in same NRHP document package
