= Blood hammer =

Clinical sign

The blood hammer phenomenon is a sudden increase of the upstream blood pressure in a blood vessel (especially artery or arteriole) when the bloodstream is abruptly blocked by vessel obstruction. The term "blood-hammer" was introduced in cerebral hemodynamics by analogy with the hydraulic expression "water hammer", already used in vascular physiology to designate an arterial pulse variety, the "water-hammer pulse". Complete understanding of the relationship between mechanical parameters in vascular occlusions is a critical issue, which can play an important role in the future diagnosis, understanding and treatment of vascular diseases.

If the time of shock wave propagation caused by the blood encountering an obstacle is equal to or less than the semilunar valve closure time, this can create a partial blood hammer phenomenon where flow speed oscillation increases without an accompanying abnormal pressure increase, whereas patients without a prolonged aortic valve closure time have the kinetic energy associated with turning around after an obstruction into a pressure peak, with little energy dedicated to increasing flow speed oscillations in a complete blood hammer effect. Flow leakage is also possible in an incomplete blood hammer, which is not seen in the complete blood hammer effect.
