= Priestly's Hydraulic Ram =

- U.S. National Register of Historic Places
- Location within Idaho Location within the United States
- Nearest city: Hagerman, Idaho
- Coordinates: 42.743°N 114.841°W (Note: These coordinates are of the general vicinity. The exact location is not known.)
- Area: less than one acre
- Built: 1890
- Architect: William W. Priestly
- NRHP reference No.: 75000631
- Added to NRHP: February 13, 1975

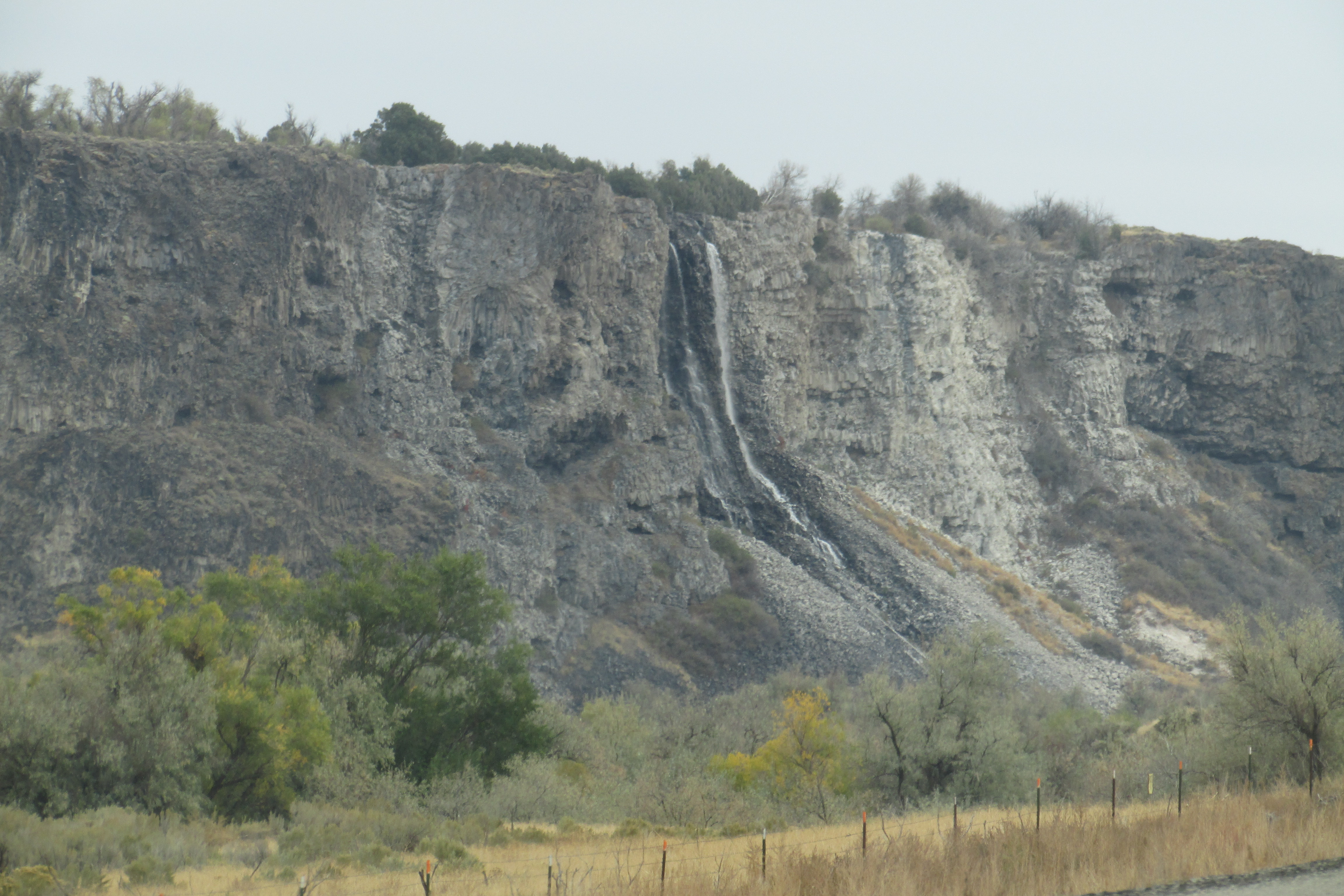
One of the waterfall streams at Thousand Springs

Priestly's Hydraulic Ram, located in Gooding County, Idaho near Hagerman, Idaho, was a hydraulic ram invented and built c. 1890. It was used to move water uphill to irrigate agricultural land on the plateau above the Snake River. It was located about 6 miles (9.7 km) south of Hagerman at Thousand Springs. The area is now Thousand Springs State Park. It was listed on the National Register of Historic Places (NRHP) in 1975.

== History ==
The ram was started by William W. Priestly to capture water, which emerged from the Snake River Aquifer on the north slope of the Snake River Canyon as spring-fed waterfalls and pump it to the top of the cliff. The ram utilized the force of the falling water to pump the water up the cliff.

Priestly started work on the project in 1888, intending to develop an irrigation system for the farmland south of Hagerman. The ram, although credited to Priestly, may have actually been built in 1901–02 by David Hyde. During its construction, a competitor, North Side Irrigation, developed an alternative system and the ram was apparently never used commercially. It was reported to have been functional in 1901.

According to an alternative account, Priestly built the ram in 1894 and was successful raising water 75 feet (23 m) and using it for irrigation at that time. He then turned his attention to gold mining, and used the same air-ram principle in the construction of a gold dredge in 1896.

== Description ==
The ram used 24 in (610 mm) diameter pipes to collect spring water, mixed with air, and send it falling downhill 190 ft (58 m) into a metal reservoir tank. The design of the tank caused the water to drain out into the river while harnessing the kinetic energy of the falling water to force air uphill through a second pipe to the reservoir tank of a second smaller ram that was fed with water dropped 60 ft (18 m) from a higher spring via a third pipe. The air pressure from the two rams was combined to push water 110 ft (34 m) to the top of the cliff through a fourth smaller pipe.

According to the NRHP nomination form, "Priestly's hydraulic ram, a pump with not one moving part, was considered truly marvelous."

Although a similar but less sophisticated ram was built in Arizona several years before, Priestly is believed to have designed his ram independently. Similar devices were built around that time (near Montreal, Quebec in 1896, Ainsworth, British Columbia in 1898 and Norwich, Connecticut in 1902). The technology did not find widespread use because the devices, which were about 70% efficient, were soon eclipsed by more efficient pumps powered by steam, gasoline, and electricity.

The ram is notable because "few such original developments in the field of power transmission have been made anywhere in the United States."

== Present ==
According to the NRHP nomination form from 1974, parts of the pipeline and the storage tank still existed. The nomination included two photos, one of a pipeline and one of the reservoir, both credited to the Twin Falls Times News and purported to have been taken in 1973. It is not clear what happened to these pieces after that. Idaho Power Company senior archaeologist Shane Baker said: "It may have been taken apart and salvaged for parts. Or moved somewhere else, or perhaps abandoned in place. To my knowledge, no one has ever found any remnants of the facility. The exact location for the ram is unknown, and it may be possible that the first hydroelectric plant built at Thousand Springs in 1912 may have been built over top of the location of the old ram."

== See also ==
- Waterwheel (McCoy, Colorado), device also used to lift water 32 feet for use in irrigation.
- Pulser Pump, a gas lift device that uses gravity to pump water to a higher elevation. It has no moving parts.
