= Hydraulic accumulator =

Reservoir to store and stabilise fluid pressure

A Hydraulic accumulator is a pressure storage reservoir in which an incompressible hydraulic fluid is held under pressure that is applied by an external source of mechanical energy. The external source can be an engine, a spring, a raised weight, or a compressed gas. (Note: Although liquids are generally considered to be practically incompressible, gases may be compressed and this compressed gas is a convenient energy store.) An accumulator enables a hydraulic system to cope with extremes of demand using a less powerful pump, to respond more quickly to a temporary demand, and to smooth out pulsations. It is a type of energy storage device.

Compressed gas accumulators, also called hydro-pneumatic accumulators, are by far the most common type.

== History ==
The hydropneumatic accumulator principle was already known in antiquity and was used, for example, in music for the construction of organs.

The invention of the organ dates back to 246 BC. Its inventor was presumably the engineer Ktesibios. He first lived in Alexandria and later in Aspendos. Both cities claim to be the place where the organ was invented. The organ Ktesibios created was called Hydraulis of Dion (ὕδραυλος, hydraulos) a word composed of hydor (water) and aulos (an oboe‑like instrument). It contained a water‑filled piston pump, a wind channel, a single row of pipes, and a keyboard. The proportions of the keys—of which there were about 13 at the time—corresponded to the spacing of the pipes, and each key was roughly hand‑width. Pressing the keys required so much force that fast playing was not yet possible.

Soon after Ktesibios’ prototype, more advanced instruments appeared with several rows of pipes that could be played individually or together. Vitruvius and Heron described the technical aspects of the hydraulos. It is said to have consisted of reed pipes as well as open and stopped flue pipes. The instrument, small and portable in antiquity (a portative), spread rapidly throughout the Hellenistic and Roman world. It was used for domestic music, in theaters, and as a propaganda instrument. By the 1st century AD, organ playing had become so widespread that public organ competitions were held in Greece. Several Roman emperors are also reported to have played the organ themselves and to have had organ music performed in their palaces. Due to the popularity of the hydraulos, small oil lamps in organ design were produced in Carthage and sold in large quantities.

The first indications of a bellows‑driven air organ date from the 2nd century AD. The instrument was called hydraulis.

A compressed gas accumulator was invented by Jean Mercier for use in variable-pitch propellers.He became known as the father of the bladder accumulator with an elastomer bladder and a split ring for oil‑valve mounting. Mercier fled France during the Nazi invasion and eventually settled in New York. After meeting Edward M. Greer in 1940, the two founded Greer Hydraulics in 1942 to manufacture hydraulic aircraft components.

== Types ==
=== Towers ===
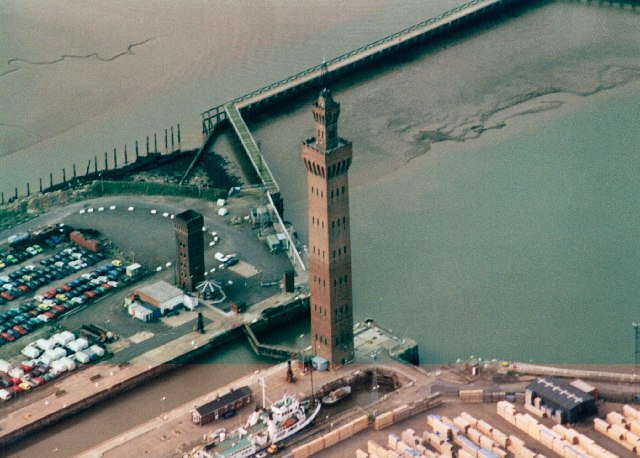
Grimsby Dock Tower

The first accumulators for William Armstrong's hydraulic dock machinery were simple raised water towers. Water was pumped to a tank at the top of these towers by steam pumps. When dock machinery required hydraulic power, the hydrostatic head of the water's height above ground provided the necessary pressure.

These simple accumulators were extremely tall. For instance, Grimsby Dock Tower, built in 1852, is 309 feet (94 m) tall. Because of their size, they were costly, and so were constructed for less than a decade. Around the same time, John Fowler was working on the construction of the ferry quay at nearby New Holland but could not use similar hydraulic power as the poor ground conditions did not permit a tall accumulator tower to be built. By the time Grimsby was opened, it was already obsolete as Armstrong had developed the more complex, but much smaller, weighted accumulator for use at New Holland. In 1892 the original Grimsby tower's function was replaced, on Fowler's advice, by a smaller weighted accumulator on an adjacent dock, although the tower remains to this day as a well-known landmark.

Other surviving towers include one adjacent to East Float in Birkenhead, England, and another located at the Bramley-Moore Dock, Liverpool, England. The latter tower is to be renovated as part of plans for the proposed development of the area associated with the construction of a new football stadium for Everton F.C.

=== Raised weight ===
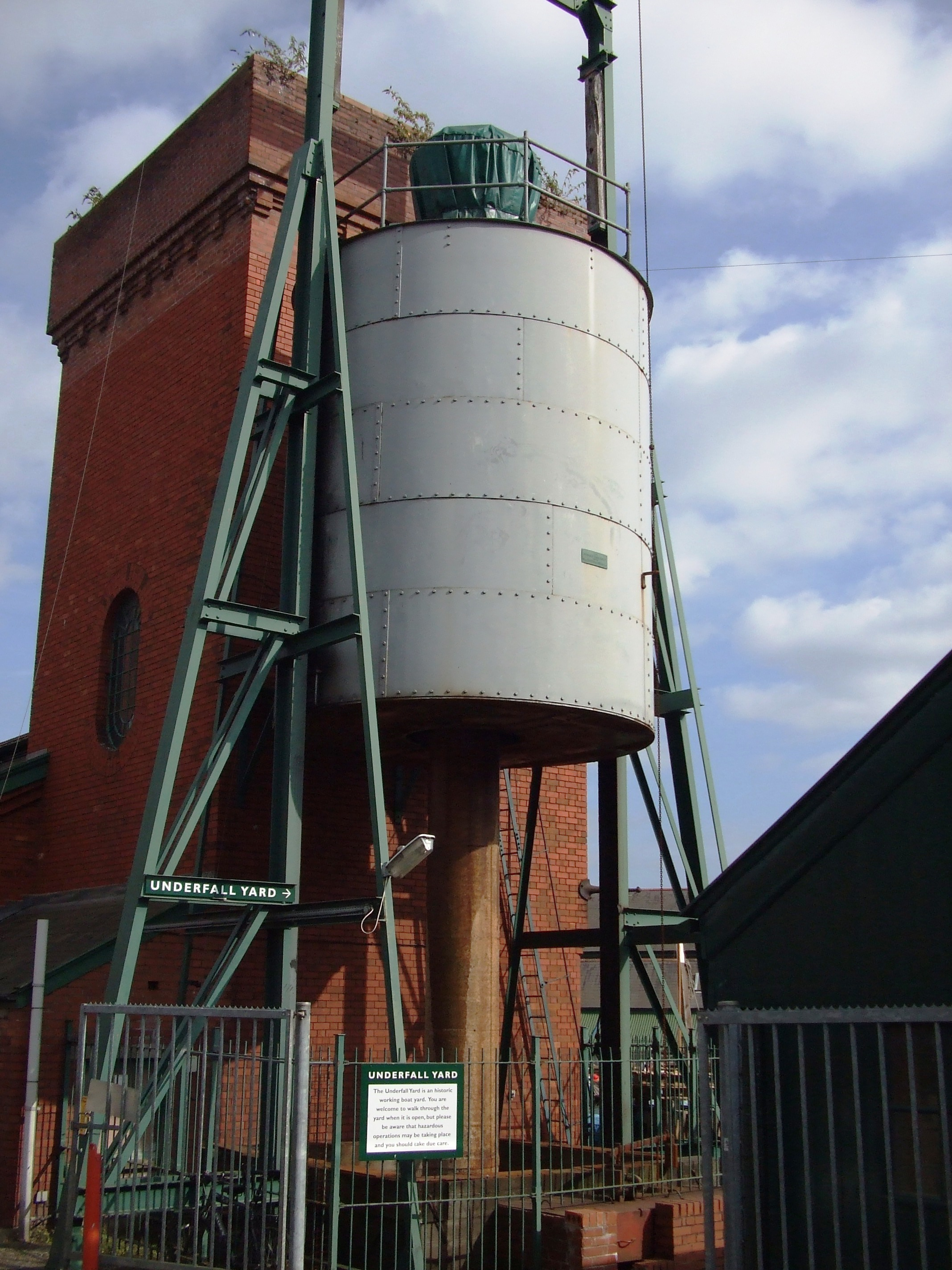
Hydraulic engine house, Bristol Harbour

A raised weight accumulator consists of a vertical cylinder containing fluid connected to the hydraulic line. The cylinder is closed by a piston on which a series of weights are placed that exert a downward force on the piston and thereby pressurizes the fluid in the cylinder. In contrast to compressed gas and spring accumulators, this type delivers a nearly constant pressure, regardless of the volume of fluid in the cylinder, until it is empty. (The pressure will decline somewhat as the cylinder is emptied due to the decline in weight of the remaining fluid.)

A working example of this type of accumulator may be found at the hydraulic engine house, Bristol Harbour. The original 1887 accumulator is in place in its tower, an external accumulator was added in 1954 and this system was used until 2010 to power the Cumberland Basin (Bristol) lock gates. The water is pumped from the harbour into a header tank and then fed by gravity to the pumps. The working pressure is 750 psi (5.2 MPa, or 52 bar) which was used to power the cranes, bridges and locks of Bristol Harbour.

The original operating mechanism of Tower Bridge, London, also used this type of accumulator. Although no longer in use, two of the six accumulators may still be seen in situ in the bridge's museum.

Regent's Canal Dock, now named Limehouse Basin has the remains of a hydraulic accumulator, dating from 1869, a fragment of the oldest remaining such facility in the world, the second at the dock, which was installed later than that at Poplar Dock, originally listed incorrectly as a signalbox for the London and Blackwall Railway, when correctly identified, it was restored as a tourist attraction by the now defunct London Docklands Development Corporation. Now owned by the Canal & River Trust, it is open for large groups on application to the Dockmaster's Office at the basin and on both the afternoons of London Open House Weekend, held on the third weekend of September each year.

London had an extensive public hydraulic power system from the mid-nineteenth century finally closing in the 1970s with 5 hydraulic power stations, operated by the London Hydraulic Power Company. Railway goods yards and docks often had their own separate system.

=== Air-filled accumulator ===
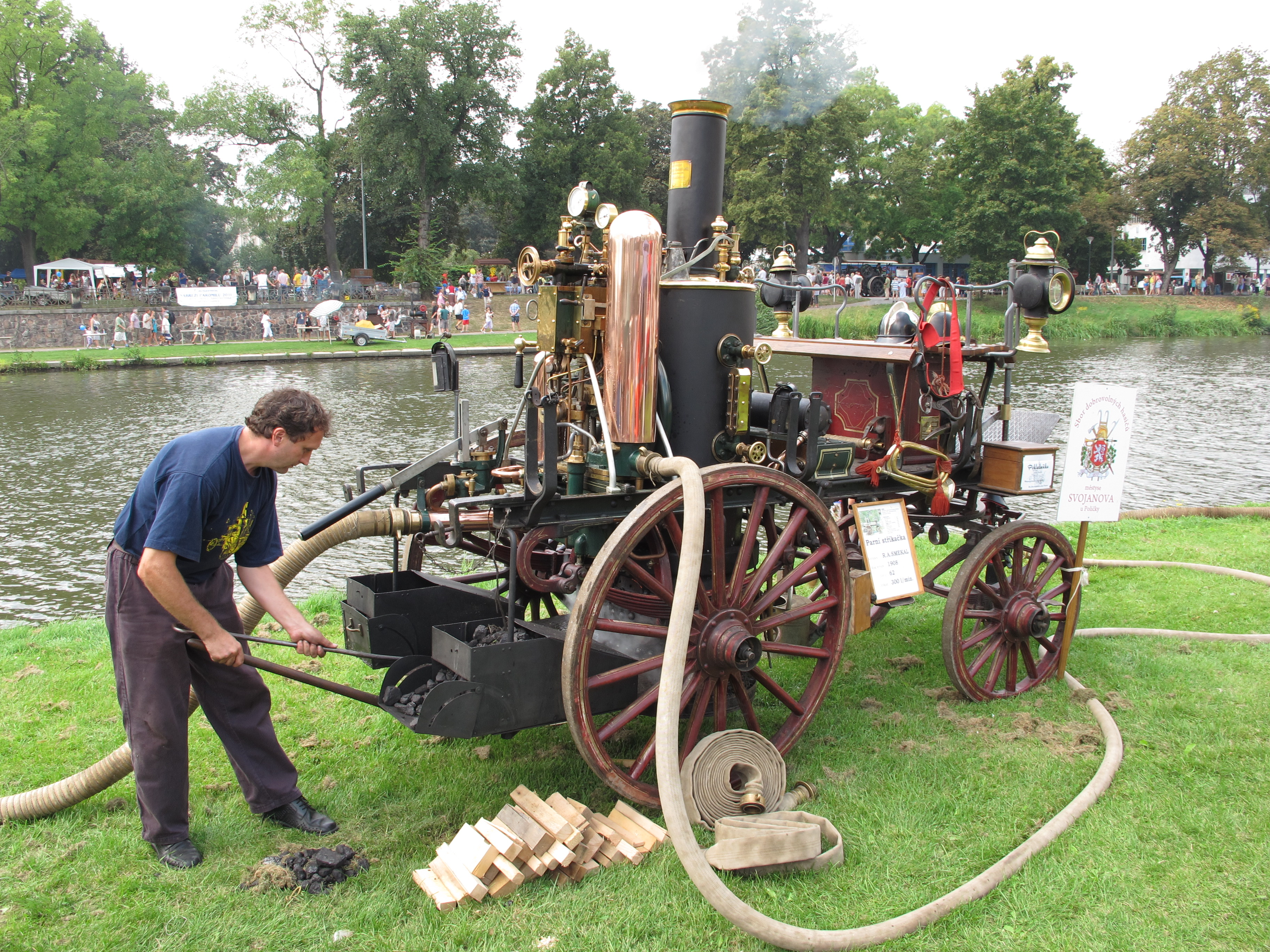
Steam fire engine, with vertical copper accumulator

A simple form of accumulator is an enclosed volume, filled with air. A vertical section of pipe, often enlarged diameter, may be enough and fills itself with air, trapped as the pipework fills.

Such accumulators typically do not have enough capacity to be useful for storing significant power since they cannot be pre-charged with high pressure gas, but they can act as a buffer to absorb fluctuations in pressure. They are used to smooth out the delivery from piston pumps. Another use is as a shock absorber to damp out water hammer; this application is an integral part of most ram pumps. Loss of air will result in loss of effectiveness. If air is lost over time, the design must include some way to replenish the accumulator.

=== Compressed gas (or gas-charged) closed accumulator ===
A bladder-type hydraulic accumulator. Fluid fills the internal rubber bladder which expands, compressing the air inside the sealed shell.

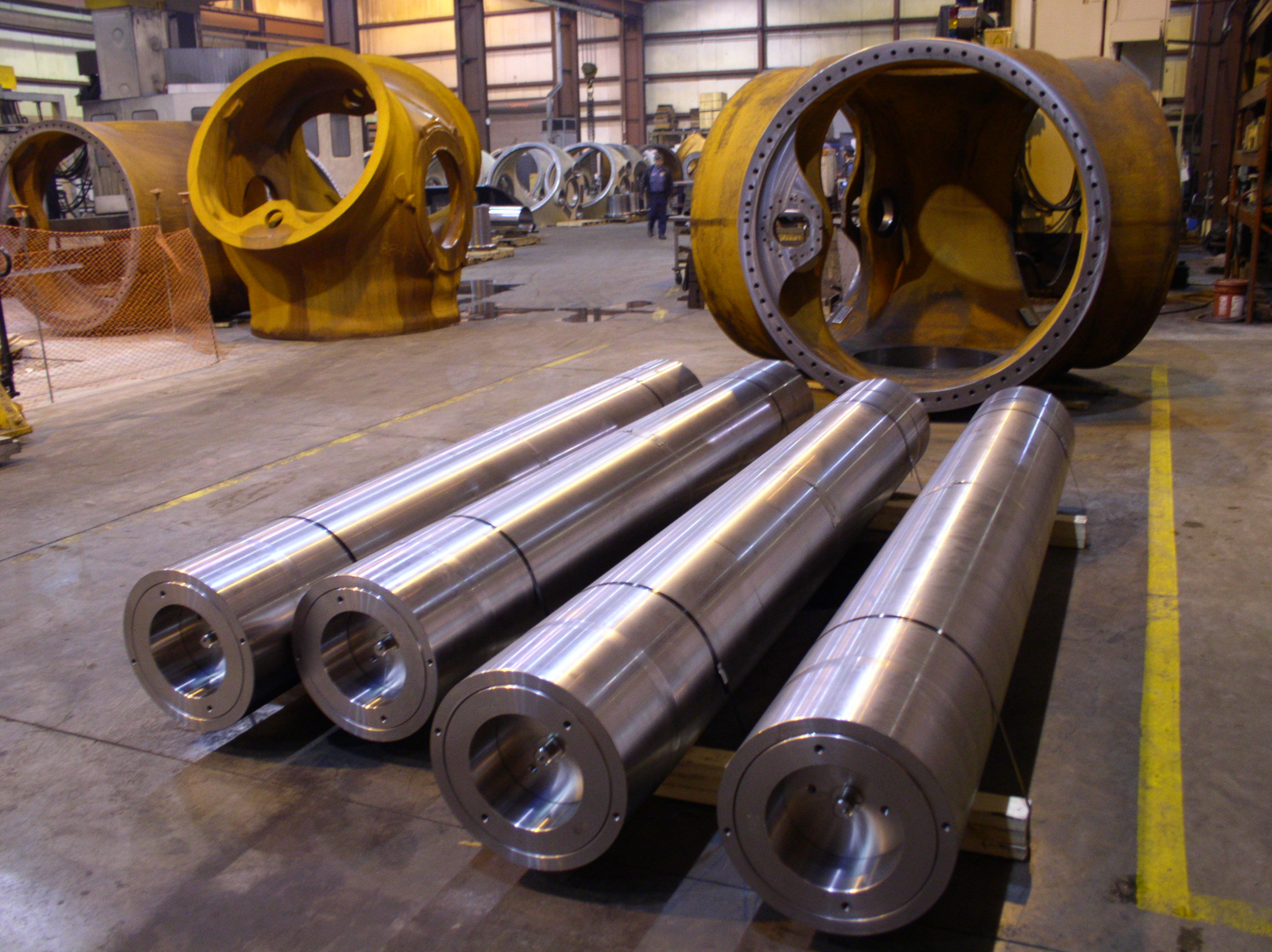
Piston accumulator

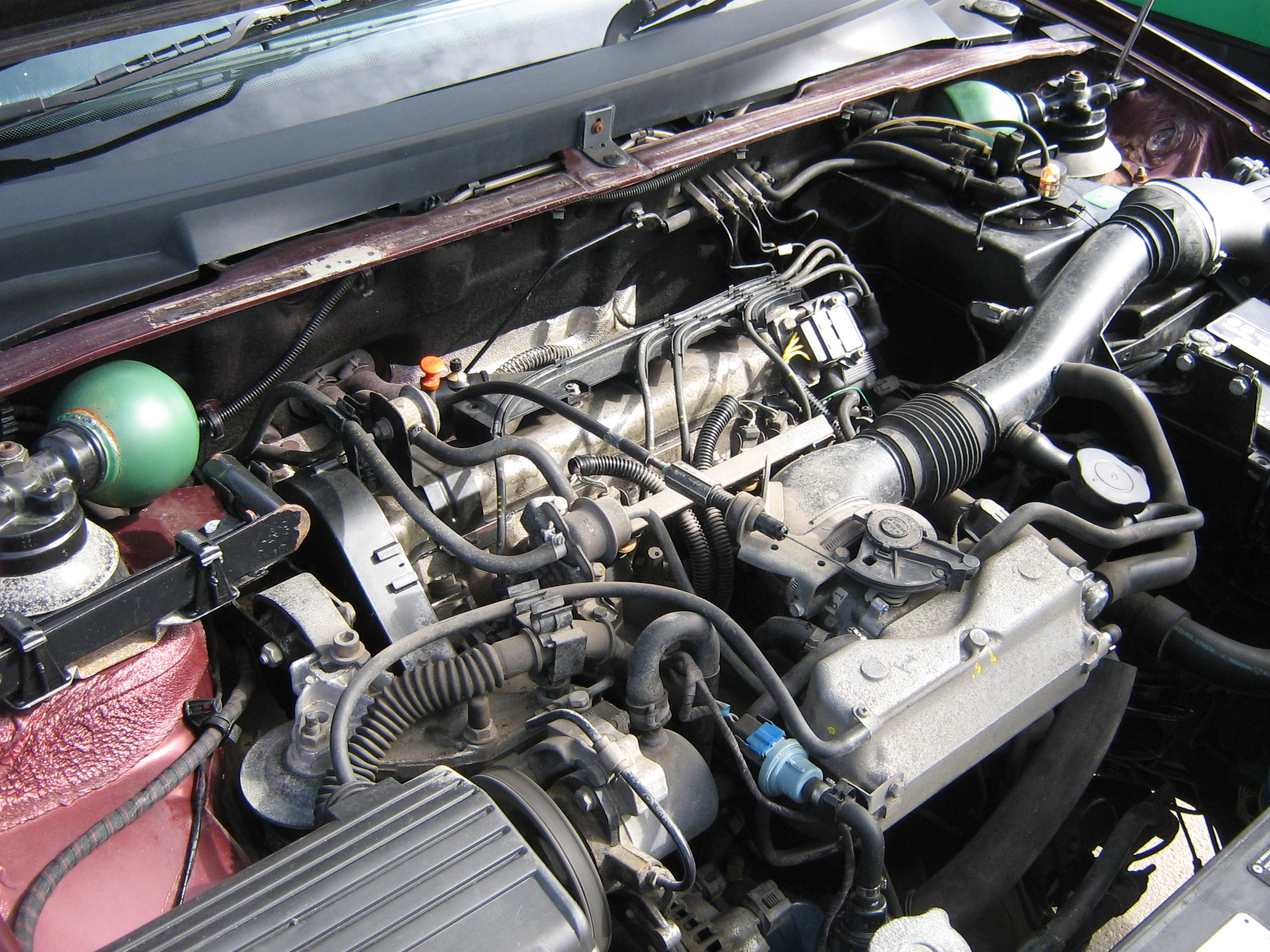
Citroën XM engine bay, showing two of Citroën's distinctive green spherical accumulators, used for the hydropneumatic suspension system

Hydraulic accumulators come in several designs:

- Diaphragm accumulators
- Bladder accumulators
- Piston accumulators
- Maintenance-free metal bellows accumulators
- Air chambers (a special design without a separating element

A compressed gas accumulator consists of a cylinder with two chambers that are separated by an elastic diaphragm, a totally enclosed bladder, or a floating piston. One chamber contains the fluid and is connected to the hydraulic line. The other chamber contains an inert gas (typically nitrogen), usually under pressure, that provides the compressive force on the hydraulic fluid. Inert gas is used because oxygen and oil can form an explosive mixture when combined under high pressure. As the volume of the compressed gas changes, the pressure of the gas (and the pressure on the fluid) changes inversely.

For low pressure water system use the water usually fills a rubber bladder within the tank (pictured), preventing contact with the tank which would otherwise need to be corrosion resistant. Units designed for high-pressure applications such as hydraulic systems are usually pre-charged to a very high pressure (approaching the system operating pressure) and are designed to prevent the bladder or membrane being damaged by this internal pressure when the system pressure is low. For bladder types this generally requires the bladder to be filled with the gas so that when system pressure is zero the bladder is fully expanded rather than being crushed by the gas charge. To prevent the bladder being forced out of the device when the system pressure is low there is typically either an anti-extrusion plate attached to the bladder that presses against and seals the entrance, or a spring-loaded plate on the entrance that closes when the bladder presses against it.

It is possible to increase the gas volume of the accumulator by coupling a gas bottle to the gas side of the accumulator. For the same swing in system pressure this will result in a larger portion of the accumulator volume being used. If the pressure does not vary over a very wide range this can be a cost effective way to reduce the size of the accumulator needed. If the accumulator is not of the piston type care must be taken that the bladder or membrane will not be damaged in any expected over-pressure situation, many bladder-type accumulators cannot tolerate the bladder being crushed under pressure.

=== Spring type ===
Spring-loaded accumulators (a special type of piston accumulator where a spring is pre-tensioned instead of using gas).

A spring type accumulator is similar in operation to the gas-charged accumulator above, except that a heavy spring (or springs) is used to provide the compressive force. According to Hooke's law the magnitude of the force exerted by a spring is linearly proportional to its change of length. Therefore, as the spring compresses, the force it exerts on the fluid is increased linearly.

=== Metal bellows type ===
The metal bellows accumulators function similarly to the compressed gas type, except that the elastic diaphragm or floating piston is replaced by a hermetically sealed welded metal bellows. Fluid may be internal or external to the bellows. The advantages to the metal bellows type include exceptionally low spring rate, allowing the gas charge to do all the work with little change in pressure from full to empty, a long stroke that allows efficient usage of the casing volume, and the bellows can be built to be resistant to overpressure that would crush a bladder-type separator. The welded metal bellows accumulator provides an exceptionally high level of accumulator performance, and can be produced with a broad spectrum of alloys, resulting in a broad range of fluid compatibility. Other advantages to this type are that it does not face issues with high pressure operation, may be built to be resistant to very high or low temperatures or certain aggressive chemicals, and may be longer lasting in some situations. Metal bellows tend to be much more costly to produce than other common types.

== Functioning ==
In modern, often mobile, hydraulic systems the preferred item is a gas charged accumulator, but simple systems may be spring-loaded. There may be more than one accumulator in a system. The exact type and placement of each may be a compromise due to its effects and the costs of manufacture.

An accumulator is placed close to the pump with a non-return valve preventing flow back to the pump. In the case of piston-type pumps this accumulator is placed in the ideal location to absorb pulsations of energy from the multi-piston pump. It also helps protect the system from fluid hammer. This protects system components, particularly pipework, from both potentially destructive forces.

An additional benefit is the additional energy that can be stored while the pump is subject to low demand. The designer can use a smaller-capacity pump. The large excursions of system components, such as landing gear on a large aircraft, that require a considerable volume of fluid can also benefit from one or more accumulators. These are often placed close to the demand to help overcome restrictions and drag from long pipework runs. The outflow of energy from a discharging accumulator is much greater, for a short time, than even large pumps could generate.

An accumulator can maintain the pressure in a system for periods when there are slight leaks without the pump being cycled on and off constantly. When temperature changes cause pressure excursions the accumulator helps absorb them. Its size helps absorb fluid that might otherwise be locked in a small fixed system with no room for expansion due to valve arrangement.

The gas precharge in an accumulator is set so that the separating bladder, diaphragm or piston does not reach or strike either end of the operating cylinder. The design precharge normally ensures that the moving parts do not foul the ends or block fluid passages. Poor maintenance of precharge can destroy an operating accumulator. A properly designed and maintained accumulator should operate trouble-free for years.

== See also ==
- Accumulator (energy)
- Expansion tank
