= Joseph Palmer Frizell =

American engineer

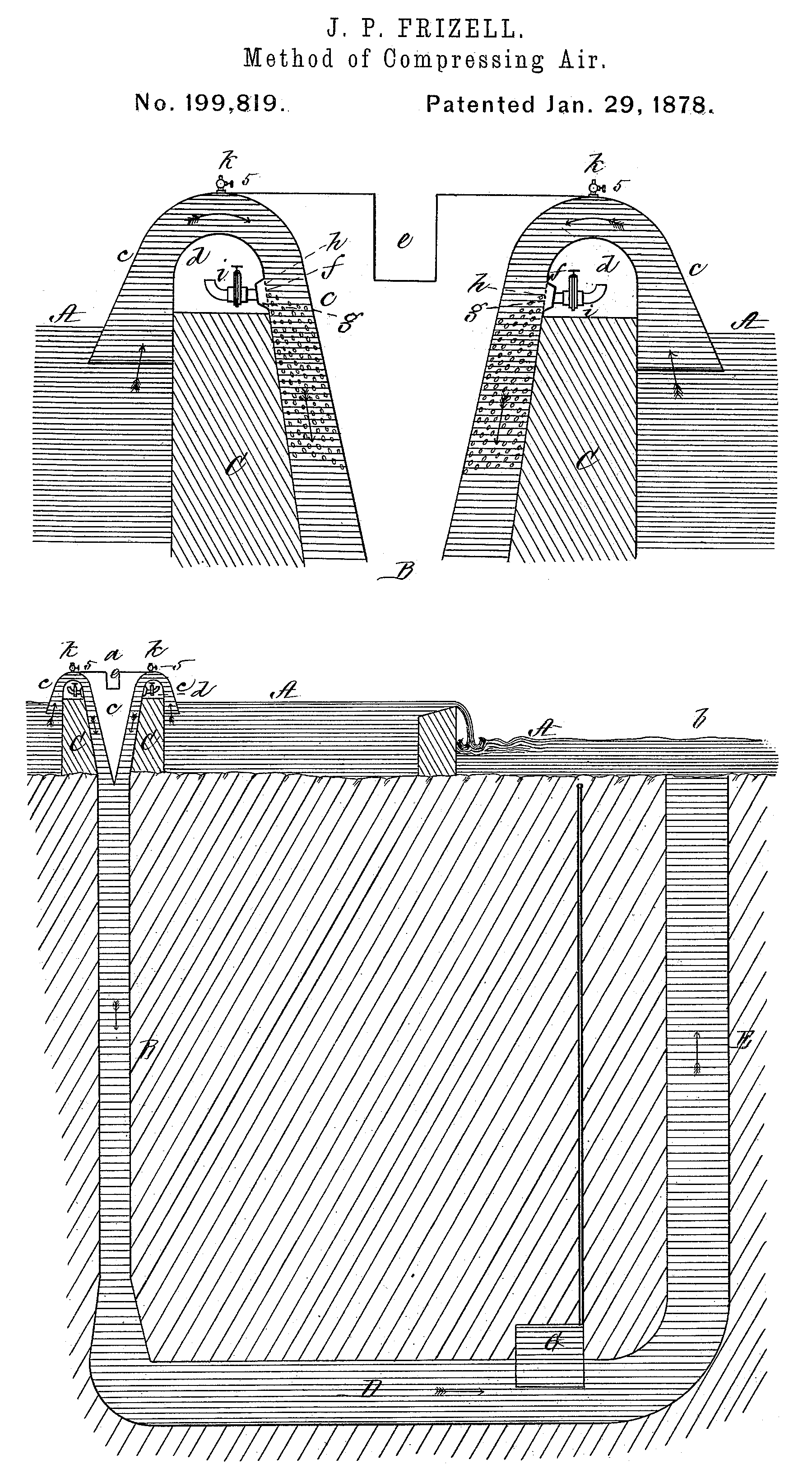
Joseph Palmer Frizell patent, about a hydraulic compressed-air power-house.

Joseph Frizell (13 March 1832 – 4 May 1910) was an American engineer. He is notable for having independently derived the fundamental equations to describe the velocity of a shock wave (Water hammer equations) in 1898, and for his book Water-Power published in 1901. Water-power was the first practical book on hydraulics in the USA. This was a major milestone in propagation of engineering knowledge in USA, as Schutze wrote ″As an hydraulic engineer, Frizell was prominent, and his book, Waterpower, filled a definitive need in the technology of that day.″ Nevertheless, Frizell's description of the Water hammer was criticized by American contemporaries and his contribution to the field is under-recognised.
