= Transient (civil engineering) =

In civil engineering, a transient is a short-lived pressure wave. A common example is water hammer.

Transients are often misunderstood and not accounted for in the design of water distribution systems, thus contributing to hydraulic element failures, such as pipe breaks and pump/valve failures.

Viscoelastic transient flow involves sudden changes in flow properties in VE pipes, leading to potential damage

The transient in electrical circuits is different.
