= Dr. Frizell House =

Historic house in Arkansas, United States

- U.S. National Register of Historic Places
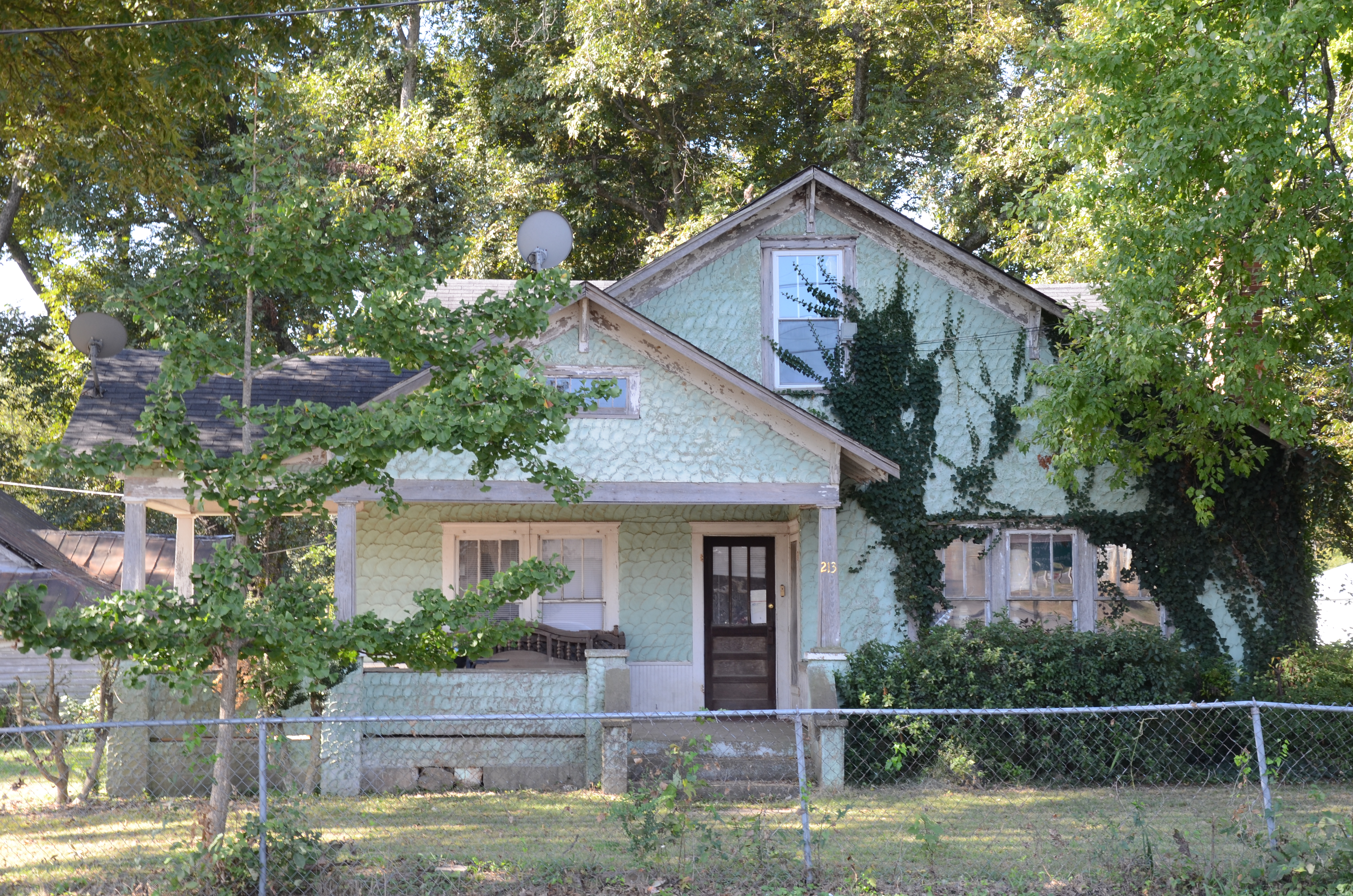

- Location within Arkansas Location within the United States
- Location: Jct. of US 67 and Elm St., Bradford, Arkansas
- Coordinates: 35°25′20″N 91°27′23″W
- Area: less than one acre
- Built: 1929
- Architect: Nichols, Courtney; Calhoun, John
- Architectural style: Bungalow/craftsman
- MPS: White County MPS
- NRHP reference No.: 91001318
- Added to NRHP: July 12, 1992

The Dr. Frizzell House is a historic house at the junction of United States Route 67 and Elm Street in Bradford, Arkansas. It is a 1 1/2-story wood-frame structure, with a broad front-facing gable roof. Its front facade has a group of three sash windows to the right, and a gable-roofed entry porch to the left, supported by Craftsman-style sloping square wooden columns mounted on stuccoed pedestals. Built about 1929, it is a good local example of Craftsman architecture.

The house was listed on the National Register of Historic Places in 1992.

== See also ==
- National Register of Historic Places listings in White County, Arkansas
