= Hydraulic ram =

Cyclic water pump powered by hydropower

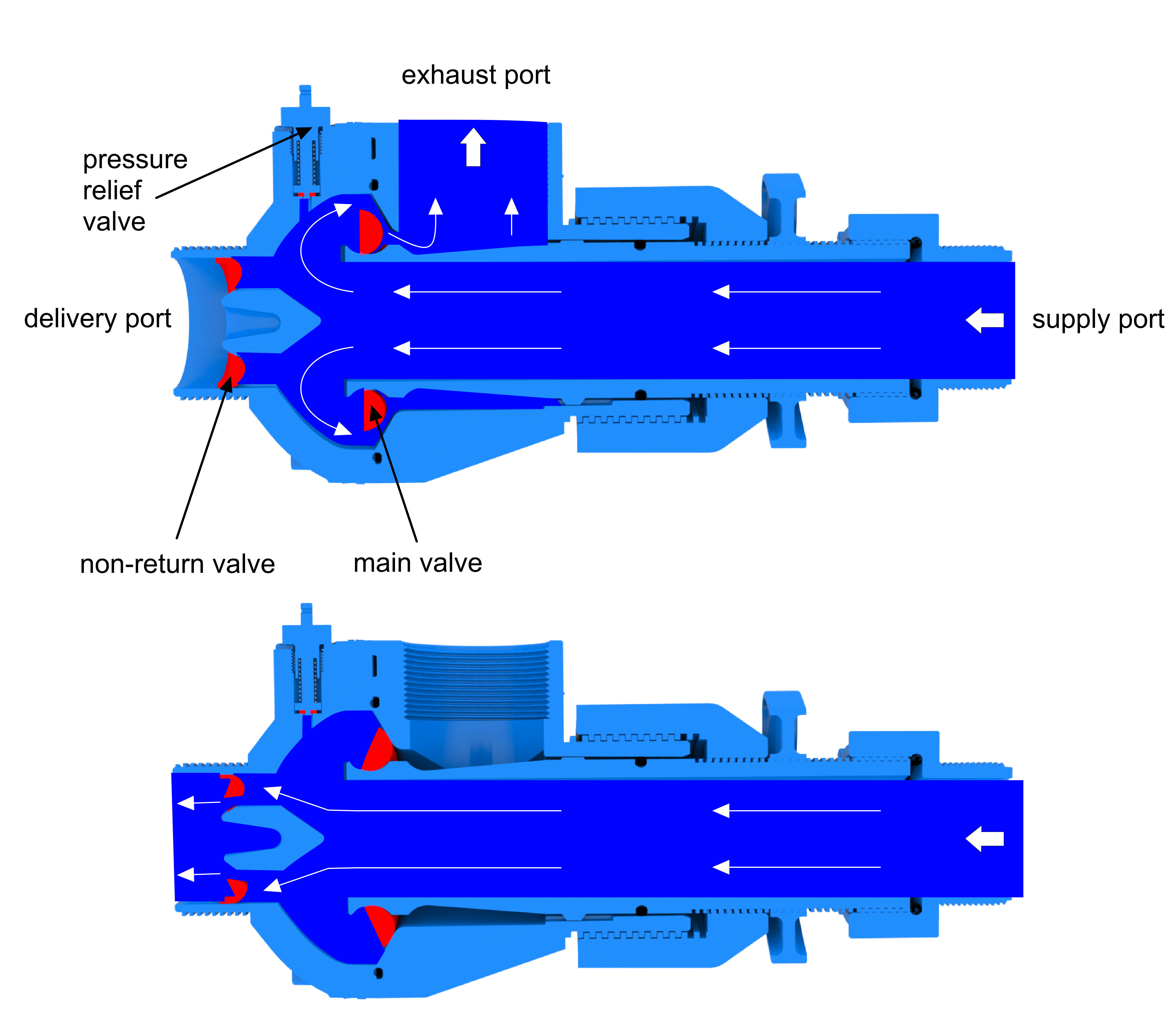
Valve arrangement of the Papa hydraulic ram pump

A hydraulic ram pump, ram pump, or hydram is a cyclic water pump powered by hydropower. It takes in water at one "hydraulic head" (pressure) and flow rate, and outputs water at a higher hydraulic head and lower flow rate. The device uses the water hammer effect to develop pressure that allows a portion of the input water that powers the pump to be lifted to a point higher than where the water originally started. The hydraulic ram is sometimes used in remote areas, where there is both a source of low-head hydropower and a need for pumping water to a destination higher in elevation than the source. In this situation, the ram is often useful, since it requires no outside source of power other than the kinetic energy of flowing water.

== History ==
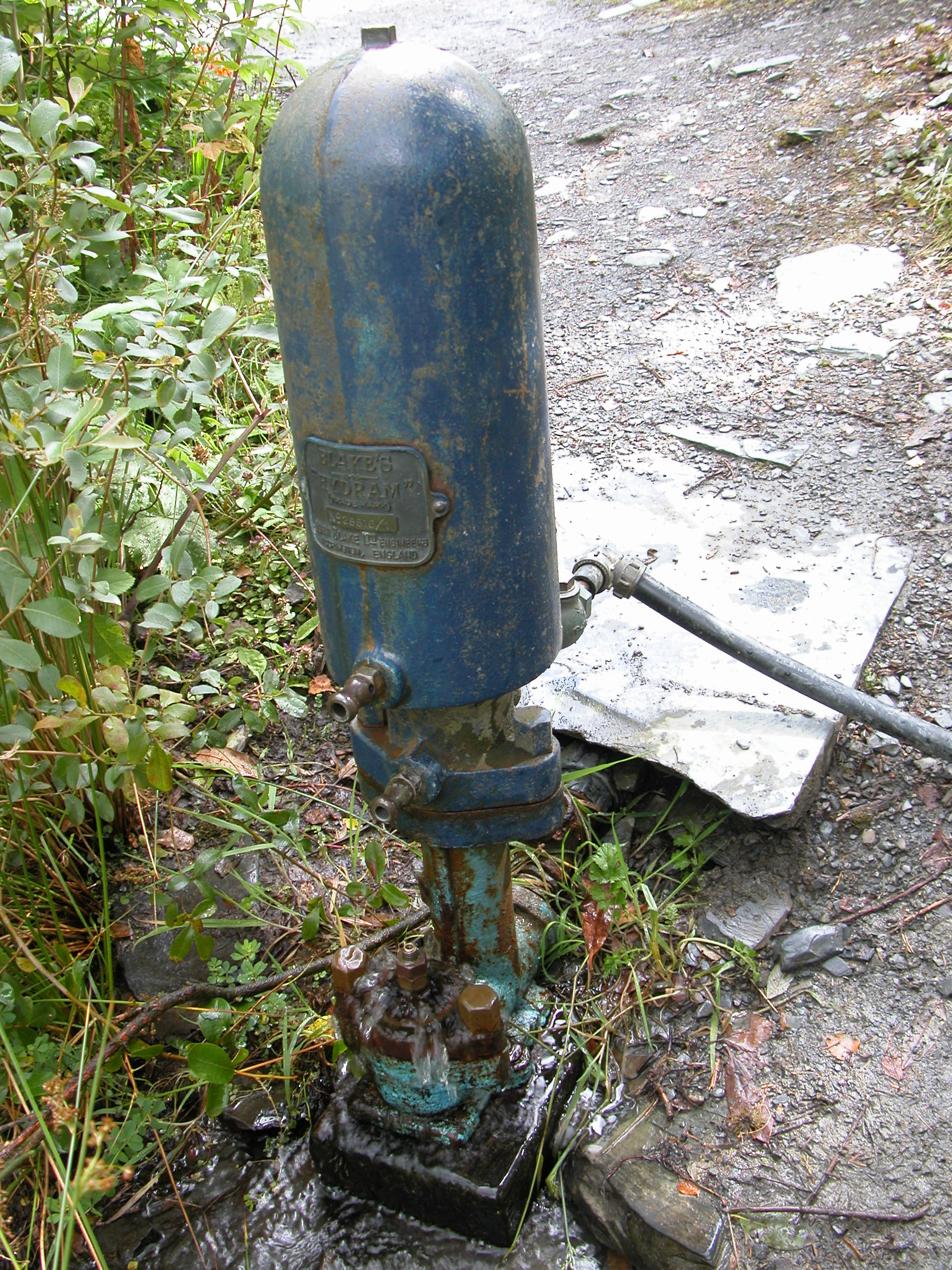
A John Blake's hydram that drives a fountain at the Centre for Alternative Technology

A ram pump in Vogn, Nordjylland, Denmark

A hydraulic ram in Kajny, Warmia, Poland

In 1772, John Whitehurst of Cheshire, England, invented a manually controlled precursor of the hydraulic ram called the "pulsation engine" and installed the first one at Oulton, Cheshire to raise water to a height of 4.9 metres (16 ft). In 1783, he installed another in Ireland. He did not patent it, and details are obscure, but it is known to have had an air vessel.

The first self-acting ram pump was invented by the Frenchman Joseph Michel Montgolfier (best known as a co-inventor of the hot air balloon) in 1796 for raising water in his paper mill at Voiron. His friend Matthew Boulton took out a British patent on his behalf in 1797. The sons of Montgolfier obtained a British patent for an improved version in 1816, and this was acquired, together with Whitehurst's design, in 1820 by Josiah Easton, a Somerset-born engineer who had just moved to London.

Easton's firm, inherited by his son James (1796–1871), grew during the nineteenth century to become one of the more important engineering manufacturers in England, with a large works at Erith, Kent. They specialised in water supply and sewerage systems worldwide, as well as land drainage projects. Eastons had a good business supplying rams for water supply purposes to large country houses, farms, and village communities. Some of their installations still survived as of 2004, one such example being at the hamlet of Toller Whelme, in Dorset. Until about 1958 when the mains water arrived, the hamlet of East Dundry just south of Bristol had three working rams – their noisy "thump" every minute or so resonated through the valley night and day: these rams served farms that needed much water for their dairy herds.

The firm closed in 1909, but the ram business was continued by James R. Easton. In 1929, it was acquired by Green & Carter of Winchester, Hampshire, who were engaged in the manufacturing and installation of Vulcan and Vacher Rams.

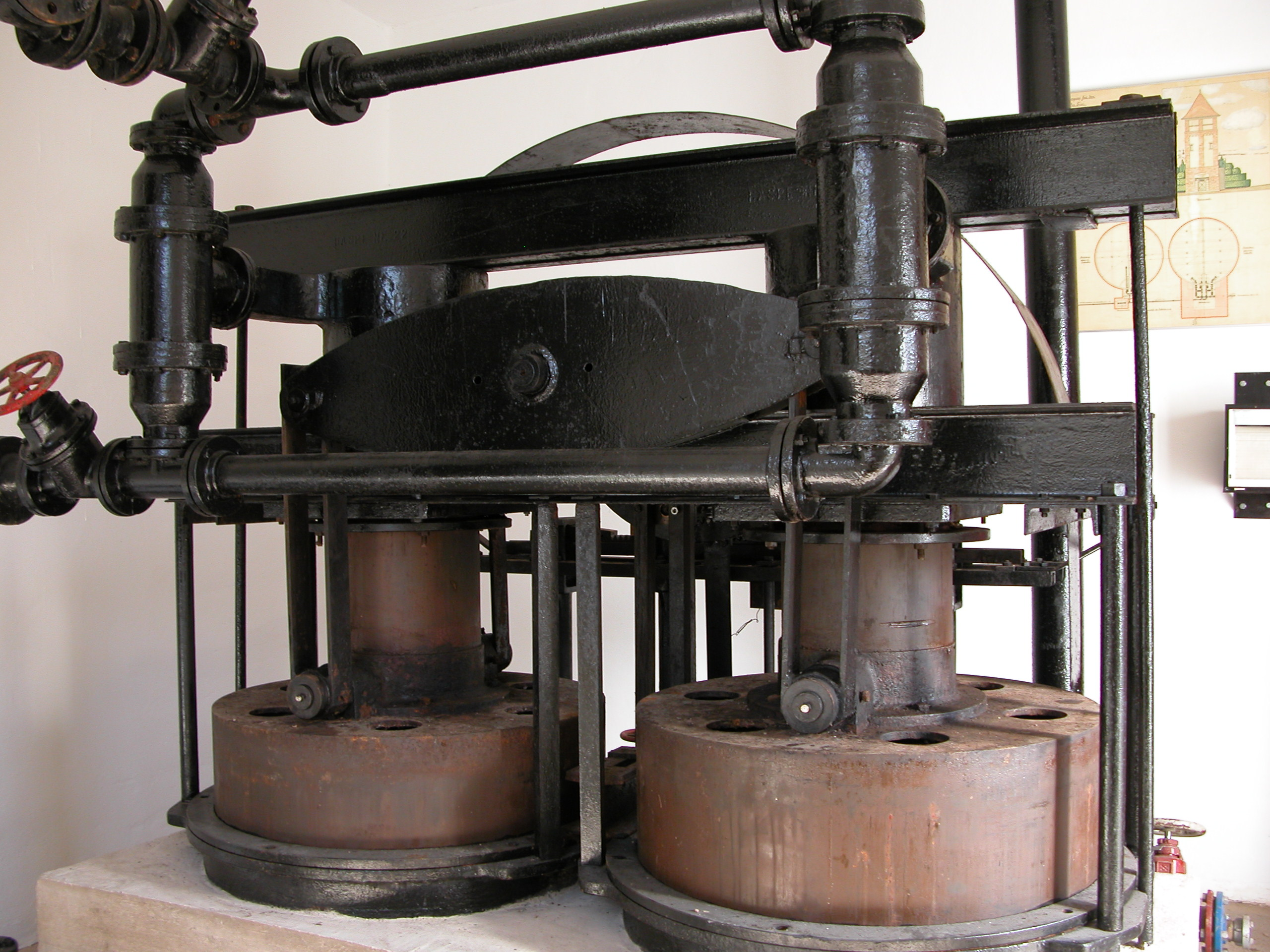
Hydraulic ram, System Lambach now at Roscheider Hof Open Air Museum

The first US patent was issued to Joseph Cerneau (or Curneau) and Stephen (Étienne) S. Hallet (1755–1825) in 1809. US interest in hydraulic rams picked up around 1840, as further patents were issued and domestic companies started offering rams for sale. Toward the end of the 19th century, interest waned as electricity and electric pumps became widely available.

Priestly's Hydraulic Ram, built in 1890 in Idaho, was a "marvelous" invention, apparently independent, which lifted water 110 feet (34 m) to provide irrigation. The ram survives and is listed on the U.S. National Register of Historic Places.

By the end of the twentieth century, interest in hydraulic rams has revived, due to the needs of sustainable technology in developing countries, and energy conservation in developed ones. An example is Aid Foundation International in the Philippines, who won an Ashden Award for their work developing ram pumps that could be easily maintained for use in remote villages. The hydraulic ram principle has been used in some proposals for exploiting wave power, one of which was discussed as long ago as 1931 by Hanns Günther in his book In hundert Jahren.

Some later ram designs in the UK called compound rams were designed to pump treated water using an untreated drive water source, which overcomes some of the problems of having drinking water sourced from an open stream.

In 1996 English engineer Frederick Philip Selwyn patented a more compact hydraulic ram pump where the waste valve used the venturi effect and was arranged concentrically around the input pipe. Initially patented as a fluid pressure amplifier due to its different design, it is currently sold as the "Papa Pump". Additionally to this a large scale version named the "Venturo Pump" is also being manufactured.

== Construction and principle of operation ==
A traditional hydraulic ram has only two moving parts, a spring or weight loaded "waste" valve sometimes known as the "clack" valve and a "delivery" check valve, making it cheap to build, easy to maintain, and very reliable.

Priestly's Hydraulic Ram, described in detail in the 1947 Encyclopedia Britannica, has no moving parts.

=== Sequence of operation ===
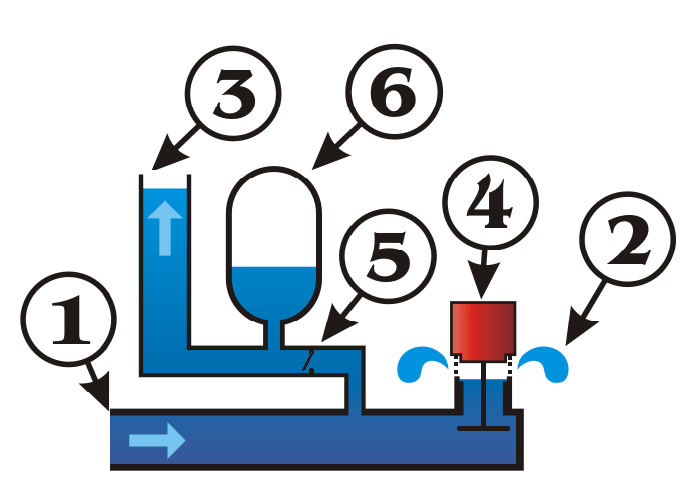
Basic components of a hydraulic ram: 1. Inlet – drive pipe; 2. Free flow at waste valve; 3. Outlet – delivery pipe; 4. Waste valve; 5. Delivery check valve; 6. Pressure vessel

In a simplified model: initially, the waste valve is open (i.e. lowered) because of its own weight, and the delivery valve is closed under the static pressure of the water column in the outlet. The water in the inlet pipe starts to flow under the force of gravity and picks up speed and kinetic energy until the increasing drag force lifts the waste valve's weight and closes it. The momentum of the water flow in the inlet pipe against the now closed waste valve causes a water hammer that raises the pressure in the pump beyond the static pressure caused by the water column in the outlet. This pressure differential now opens the delivery valve, and forces some water to flow into the delivery pipe. Because this water is being forced uphill through the delivery pipe farther than it is falling downhill from the source, the flow slows; when the flow reverses, the delivery check valve closes. Meanwhile, the water hammer from the closing of the waste valve also produces a pressure pulse which propagates back up the inlet pipe to the source where it converts to a suction pulse that propagates back down the inlet pipe. This suction pulse, with the weight or spring on the valve, pulls the waste valve back open and allows the process to begin again.

A pressure vessel containing air cushions the hydraulic pressure shock when the waste valve closes, and it also improves the pumping efficiency by allowing a more constant flow through the delivery pipe. Although the pump could in theory work without it, the efficiency would drop drastically and the pump would be subject to extraordinary stresses that could shorten its life considerably. One problem is that the pressurized air will gradually dissolve into the water until none remains. One solution to this problem is to have the air separated from the water by an elastic diaphragm (similar to an expansion tank); however, this solution can be problematic in developing countries where replacements are difficult to procure. Another solution is a snifting valve installed close to the drive side of the delivery valve. This automatically inhales a small amount of air each time the delivery valve shuts and the partial vacuum develops. Another solution is to insert an inner tube of a car or bicycle tire into the pressure vessel with some air in it and the valve closed. This tube is in effect the same as the diaphragm, but it is implemented with more widely available materials. The air in the tube cushions the shock of the water the same as the air in other configurations does.

=== Efficiency ===
A typical energy efficiency is 60%, but up to 80% is possible. This should not be confused with the volumetric efficiency, which relates the volume of water delivered to total water taken from the source. The portion of water available at the delivery pipe will be reduced by the ratio of the delivery head to the supply head. Thus if the source is 2 metres (6.6 ft) above the ram and the water is lifted to 10 metres (33 ft) above the ram, only 20% of the supplied water can be available, the other 80% being spilled via the waste valve. These ratios assume 100% energy efficiency. Actual water delivered will be further reduced by the energy efficiency factor. In the above example, if the energy efficiency is 70%, the water delivered will be 70% of 20%, i.e. 14%. Assuming a 2-to-1 supply-head-to-delivery-head ratio and 70% efficiency, the delivered water would be 70% of 50%, i.e. 35%. Very high ratios of delivery to supply head usually result in lowered energy efficiency. Suppliers of rams often provide tables giving expected volume ratios based on actual tests.

=== Drive and delivery pipe design ===
Since both efficiency and reliable cycling depend on water hammer effects, the drive pipe design is important. It should be between 3 and 7 times longer than the vertical distance between the source and the ram. Commercial rams may have an input fitting designed to accommodate this optimum slope. The diameter of the supply pipe would normally match the diameter of the input fitting on the ram, which in turn is based on its pumping capacity. The drive pipe should be of constant diameter and material, and should be as straight as possible. Where bends are necessary, they should be smooth, large diameter curves. Even a large spiral is allowed, but elbows are to be avoided. PVC will work in some installations, but steel pipe is preferred, although much more expensive. If valves are used they should be a free flow type such as a ball valve or gate valve.

The delivery pipe is much less critical since the pressure vessel prevents water hammer effects from traveling up it. Its overall design would be determined by the allowable pressure drop based on the expected flow. Typically the pipe size will be about half that of the supply pipe, but for very long runs a larger size may be indicated. PVC pipe and any necessary valves are not a problem.

=== Starting operation ===
A ram newly placed into operation or which has stopped cycling should start automatically if the waste valve weight or spring pressure is adjusted correctly, but it can be restarted as follows: If the waste valve is in the raised (closed) position, it must be pushed down manually into the open position and released. If the flow is sufficient, it will then cycle at least once. If it does not continue to cycle, it must be pushed down repeatedly until it cycles continuously on its own, usually after three or four manual cycles. If the ram stops with the waste valve in the down (open) position it must be lifted manually and kept up for as long as necessary for the supply pipe to fill with water and for any air bubbles to travel up the pipe to the source. This may take some time, depending on supply pipe length and diameter. Then it can be started manually by pushing it down a few times as described above. Having a valve on the delivery pipe at the ram makes starting easier. Closing the valve until the ram starts cycling, then gradually opening it to fill the delivery pipe. If opened too quickly it will stop the cycle. Once the delivery pipe is full the valve can be left open.

=== Common operational problems ===
Failure to deliver sufficient water may be due to improper adjustment of the waste valve, having too little air in the pressure vessel, or simply attempting to raise the water higher than the level of which the ram is capable.

The ram may be damaged by freezing in winter, or loss of air in the pressure vessel leading to excess stress on the ram parts. These failures will require welding or other repair methods and perhaps parts replacement.

It is not uncommon for an operating ram to require occasional restarts. The cycling may stop due to poor adjustment of the waste valve, or insufficient water flow at the source. Air can enter if the supply water level is not at least a few inches above the input end of the supply pipe. Other problems are blockage of the valves with debris, or improper installation, such as using a supply pipe of non-uniform diameter or material, having sharp bends or a rough interior, or one that is too long or short for the drop, or is made of an insufficiently rigid material. A PVC supply pipe will work in some installations but a steel pipe is better.

== See also ==
- Boost converter – electronic–hydraulic analog of the hydraulic ram.
- Heron's fountain
- Pulser pump, a similar device made from a trompe connected to an airlift pump
- Tesla valve
- Water rocket
