= Inertance =

Fluid pressure gradient required to cause a unit change in volumetric flow rate

In fluid mechanics, inertance is a measure of the pressure difference in a fluid required to cause a unit change in the rate of change of volumetric flow-rate with time. The base SI units of inertance are kg m^{−4} or Pa s^{2} m^{−3} and the usual symbol is I.

The inertance of a tube is given by:

$$I = {\rho\ell \over A} \,$$

where

$\rho$ is the density (with dimensionality of mass per volume) of the fluid
$\ell$ is the length of the tube
$A$ is the cross-sectional area of the tube

The pressure difference is related to the change in flow-rate by the equation:

$$\Delta p = I\dot{Q} = I {\mathrm{d}Q \over \mathrm{d}t}$$

where

$p$ is the pressure of the fluid
$Q$ is the volumetric flow-rate (with dimensionality of volume per time)

This equation assumes constant density, that the acceleration is uniform, and that the flow is fully developed "plug flow". This precludes sharp bends, water hammer, and so on.

To some, it may appear counterintuitive that an increase in cross-sectional area of a tube reduces the inertance of the tube. However, for the same mass flow-rate, a lower cross-sectional area implies a higher fluid velocity and therefore a higher pressure difference to accelerate the fluid.

In respiratory physiology, inertance (of air) is measured in cm_{H_{2}O} s^{2} L^{−1}.

1 cm_{H_{2}O} s^{2} L^{−1} ≈ 98100 Pa s^{2} m^{−3}.

Using small-signal analysis, an inertance can be represented as a fluid reactance (cf. electrical reactance) through the relation:

$$X = j \omega I$$

where

$$\omega = 2 \pi f$$
$f$ is the frequency in Hz.
