= Headlamp =

Lamp mounted in the front of a vehicle

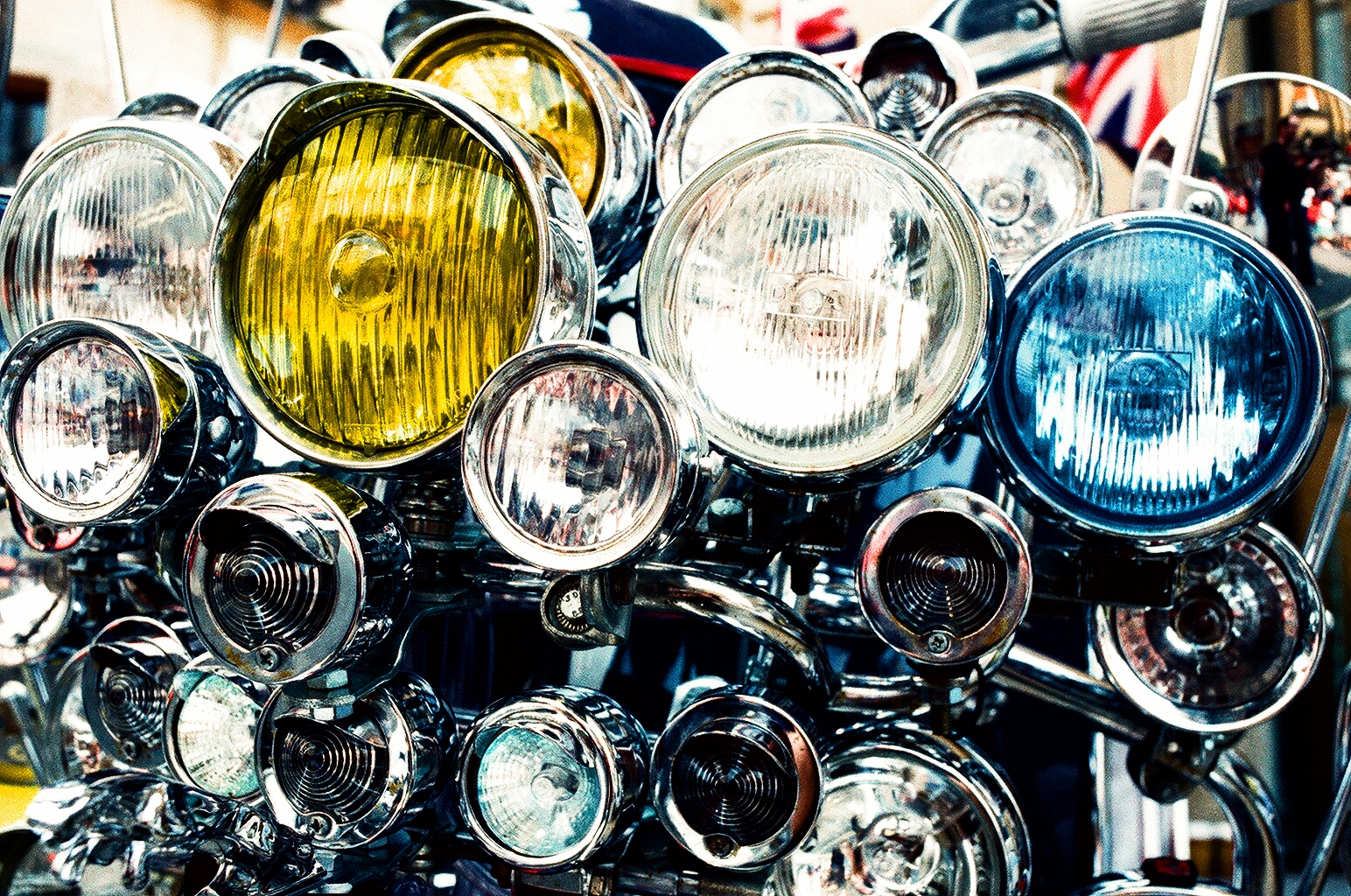
A motor scooter's front with an impractical number and variety of headlamps, added for decorative purposes and characteristic of Mod culture

A headlamp is a lamp attached to the front of a vehicle to illuminate the road ahead. Headlamps are also often called headlights, but in United States usage, headlamp is the term for the device itself and headlight is the term for the beam of light produced and distributed by the device.

Headlamp performance has steadily improved throughout the automobile age, spurred by the great disparity between daytime and nighttime traffic fatalities: the US National Highway Traffic Safety Administration states that nearly half of all traffic-related fatalities occur in the dark, despite only 25% of traffic travelling during darkness.

Other vehicles, such as trains and aircraft, are required to have headlamps. Bicycle headlamps are often used on bicycles, and are required in some jurisdictions. They can be powered by a battery or a small generator like a bottle dynamo or hub dynamo.

== History of automotive headlamps ==
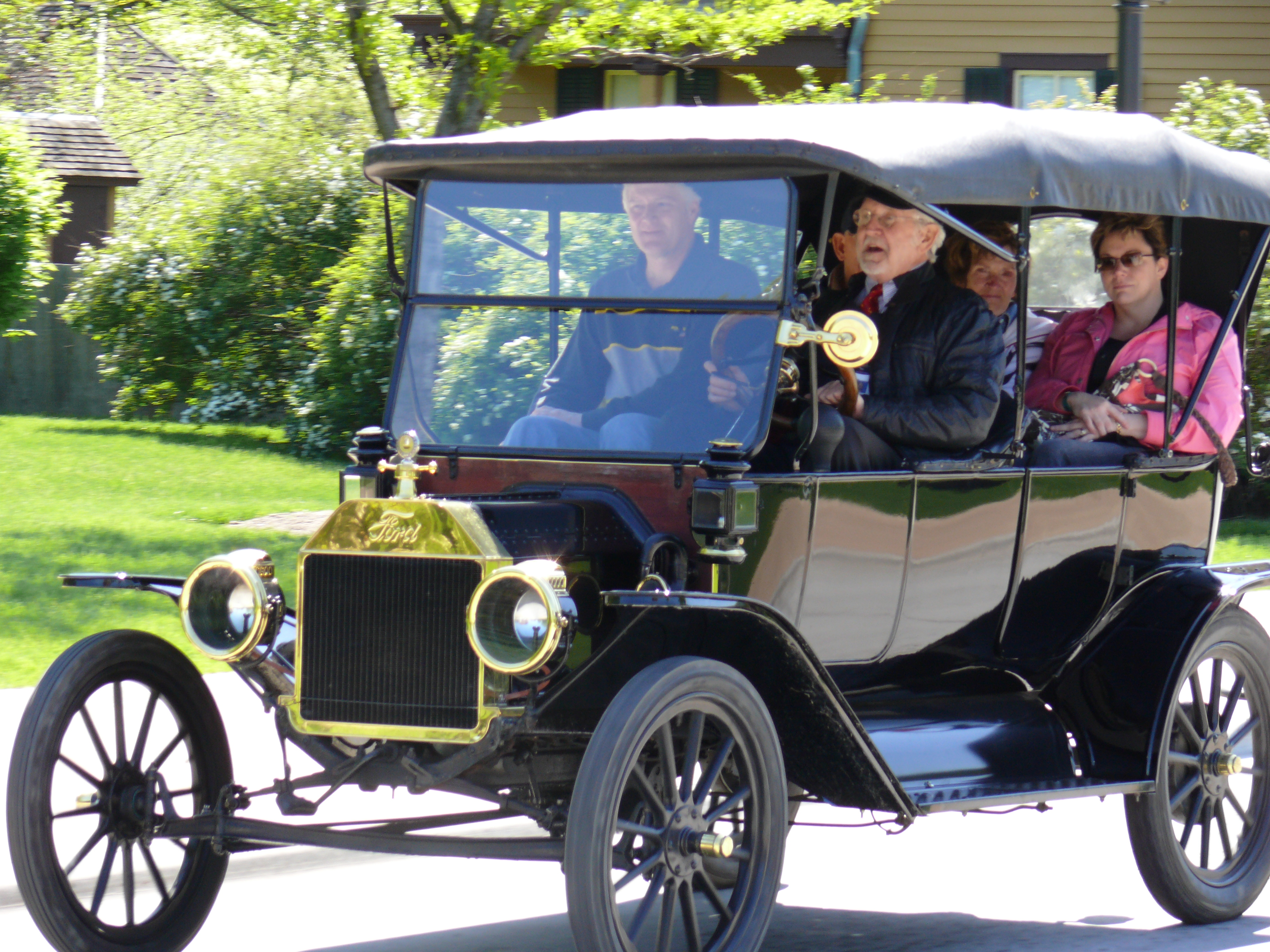
Ford Model T with acetylene gas headlamps

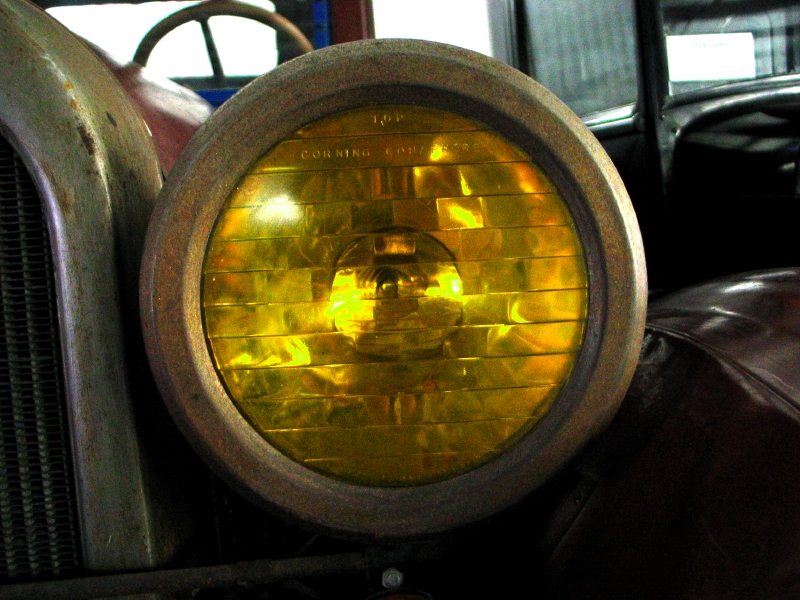
One of the first optical headlamp lenses, the Corning Conaphore. Selective yellow "Noviol" glass version shown.

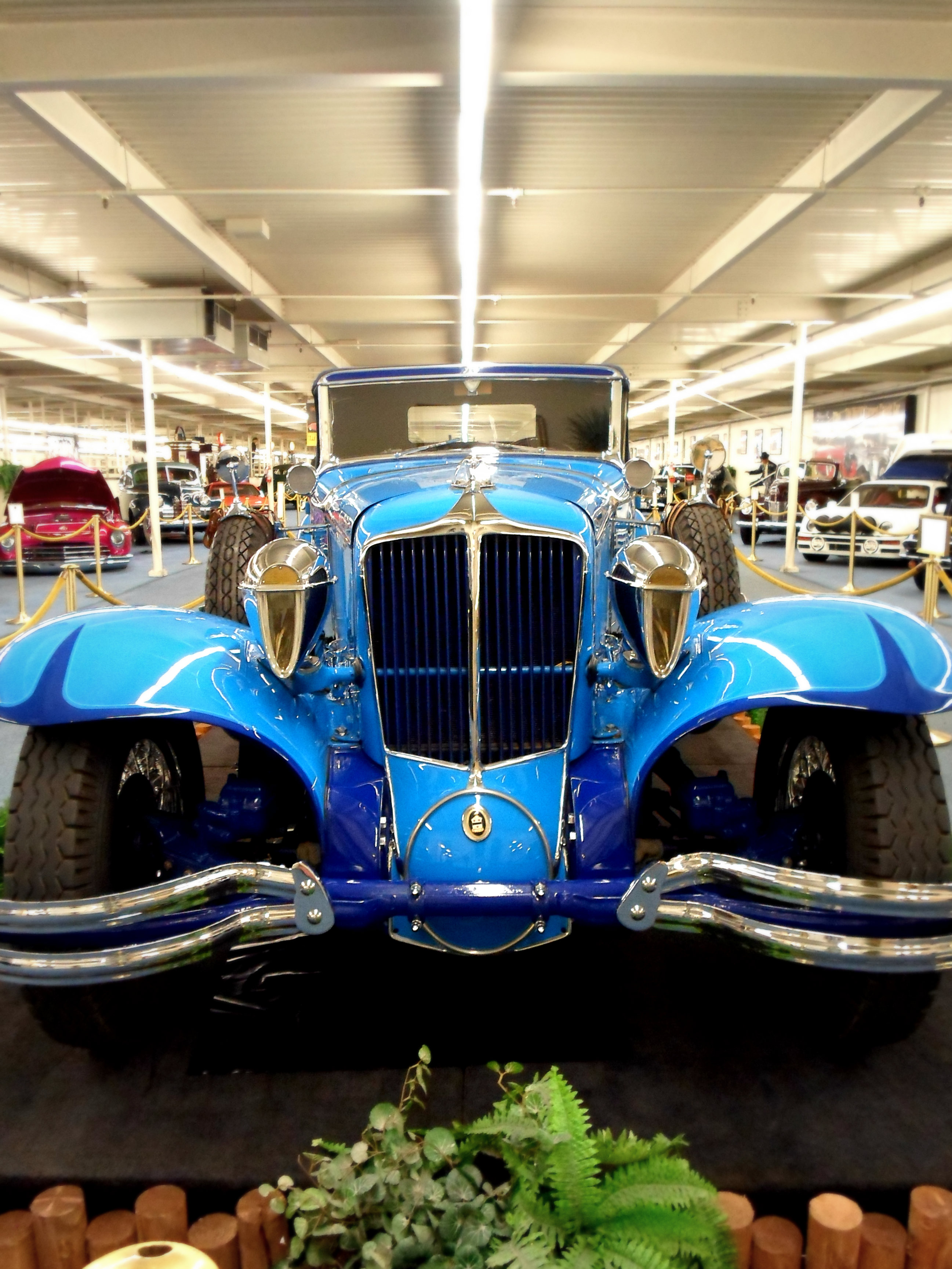
1929 Cord L-29 with Woodlite headlamps U.S. patent 1,679,108

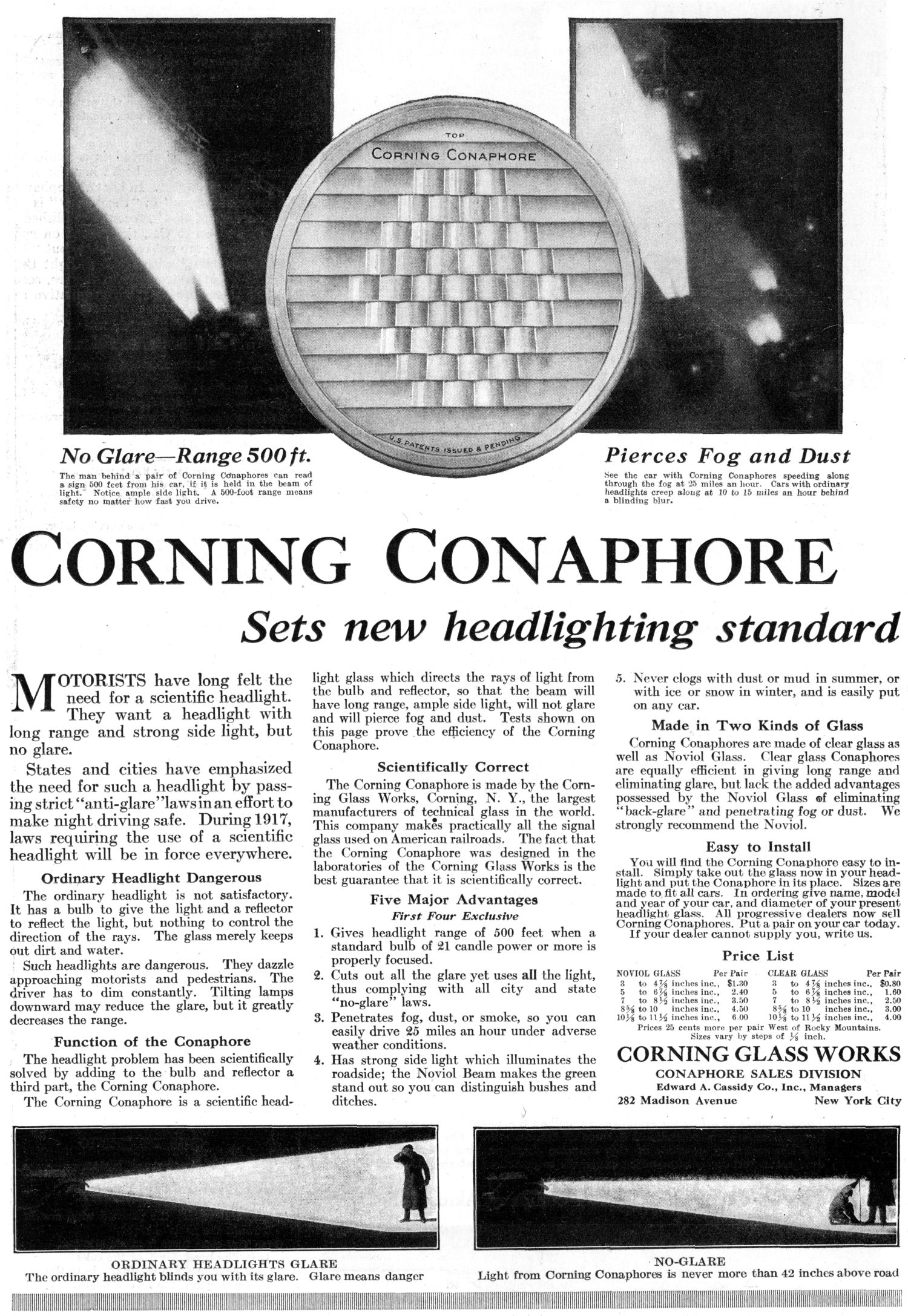
1917 advertisement for the Corning Conaphore headlamp lens shown above

=== Origins ===
The first horseless carriages used carriage lamps, which proved unsuitable for travel at speed. The earliest lights used candles as the most common type of fuel. Some carriages used oil lamp and Kerosene lamp for lighting.

=== Mechanics ===
==== Acetylene Gas headlamp ====
The earliest headlamps, fuelled by combustible gas such as acetylene gas or oil, operated from the late 1880s. Acetylene gas lamps were popular in 1900s because the flame produced bright white light that was resistant to wind and rain. The gas is ignited manually. Thick concave mirrors combined with magnifying lenses projected the acetylene flame light. A number of car manufacturers offered Prest-O-Lite calcium carbide acetylene gas generator cylinder with gas feed pipes for lights as standard equipment for 1904 cars.

==== Electric headlamp ====
The first electric headlamps were introduced in 1898 on the Columbia Electric Car from the Electric Vehicle Company of Hartford, Connecticut, and were optional. Two factors limited the widespread use of electric headlamps: the short life of filaments in the harsh automotive environment, and the difficulty of producing dynamos small enough, yet powerful enough to produce sufficient current.

Peerless made electric headlamps standard in 1908. A Birmingham, England firm called Pockley Automobile Electric Lighting Syndicate marketed the world's first electric car-lights as a complete set in 1908, which consisted of headlamps, sidelamps, and tail lights that were powered by an eight-volt battery.

In 1912 Cadillac integrated their vehicle's Delco electrical ignition and lighting system, forming the modern vehicle electrical system.

The Guide Lamp Company introduced "dipping" (low-beam) headlamps in 1915, but the 1917 Cadillac system allowed the light to be dipped using a lever inside the car rather than requiring the driver to stop and get out. The 1924 Bilux bulb was the first modern unit, having the light for both low (dipped) and high (main) beams of a headlamp emitting from a single bulb. A similar design was introduced in 1925 by Guide Lamp called the "Duplo". In 1927 the foot-operated dimmer switch or dip switch was introduced and became standard for much of the century. 1933–1934 Packards featured tri-beam headlamps, the bulbs having three filaments. From highest to lowest, the beams were called "country passing", "country driving" and "city driving". The 1934 Nash also used a three-beam system, although in this case with bulbs of the conventional two-filament type, and the intermediate beam combined low beam on the driver's side with high beam on the passenger's side, so as to maximise the view of the roadside while minimizing glare toward oncoming traffic. The last vehicles with a foot-operated dimmer switch were the 1991 Ford F-Series and E-Series [Econoline] vans. Fog lamps were new for 1938 Cadillacs, and their 1952 "Autronic Eye" system automated the selection of high and low beams.

Directional lighting, using a switch and electromagnetically shifted reflector to illuminate the curbside only, was introduced in the rare, one-year-only 1935 Tatra. Steering-linked lighting was featured on the 1947 Tucker Torpedo's center-mounted headlight and was later popularized by the Citroën DS. This made it possible to turn the light in the direction of travel when the steering wheel turned.

The standardized 7-inch (178 mm) round sealed-beam headlamp, one per side, was required for all vehicles sold in the United States from 1940, virtually freezing usable lighting technology in place until the 1970s for Americans. In 1957 the law changed to allow smaller 5.75-inch (146 mm) round sealed beams, two per side of the vehicle, and in 1974 rectangular sealed beams were permitted as well.

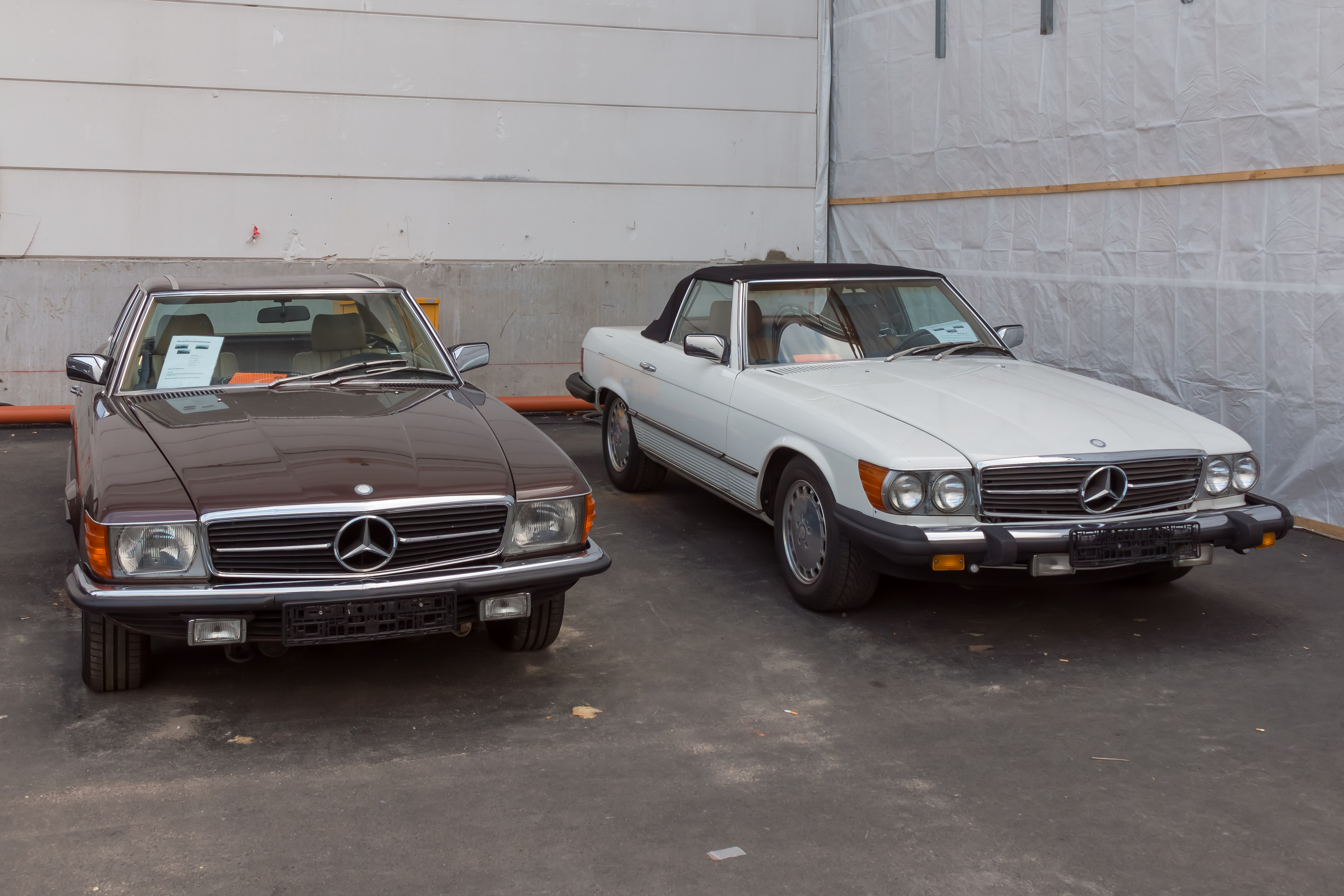
Two Mercedes-Benz SL: right with US-spec sealed beam type headlamps; left with normal headlamps for other markets

Britain, Australia, and some other Commonwealth countries, as well as Japan and Sweden, also made extensive use of 7-inch sealed beams, though they were not mandated as they were in the United States. This headlamp format was not widely accepted in continental Europe, which found replaceable bulbs and variations in the size and shape of headlamps useful in car design.

Technology moved forward in the rest of the world. In 1962 a European consortium of bulb- and headlamp-makers introduced the first halogen lamp for vehicle headlamp use, the H1. Shortly thereafter headlamps using the new light source were introduced in Europe. These were effectively prohibited in the US, where standard-size sealed beam headlamps were mandatory and intensity regulations were low. US lawmakers faced pressure to act, due both to lighting effectiveness and to vehicle aerodynamics/fuel savings. High-beam peak intensity, capped at 140,000 candela per side of the car in Europe, was limited in the United States to 37,500 candela on each side of the car until 1978, when the limit was raised to 75,000. An increase in high-beam intensity to take advantage of the higher allowance could not be achieved without a move to halogen technology, and so sealed-beam headlamps with internal halogen lamps became available for use on 1979 models in the United States. As of 2010 halogen sealed beams dominate the sealed-beam market, which has declined steeply since replaceable-bulb headlamps were permitted in 1983.

High-intensity discharge (HID) systems appeared in the early 1990s, first in the BMW 7 Series. 1996's Lincoln Mark VIII was an early American effort at HIDs, and was the only car with DC HIDs.

=== Design and style ===
Beyond the engineering, performance, and regulatory-compliance aspects of headlamps, there is the consideration of the various ways they are designed and arranged on a motor vehicle. Headlamps were round for many years because that is the native shape of a parabolic reflector. Using principles of reflection, the simple symmetric round reflective surface projects light and helps focus the beam.

==== Headlamp styling outside the United States, pre-1983 ====
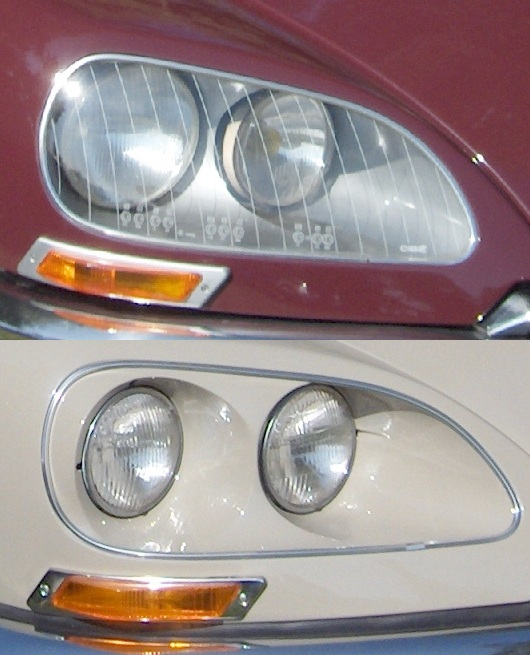
European (top) and US (bottom) headlamp configurations on a Citroën DS

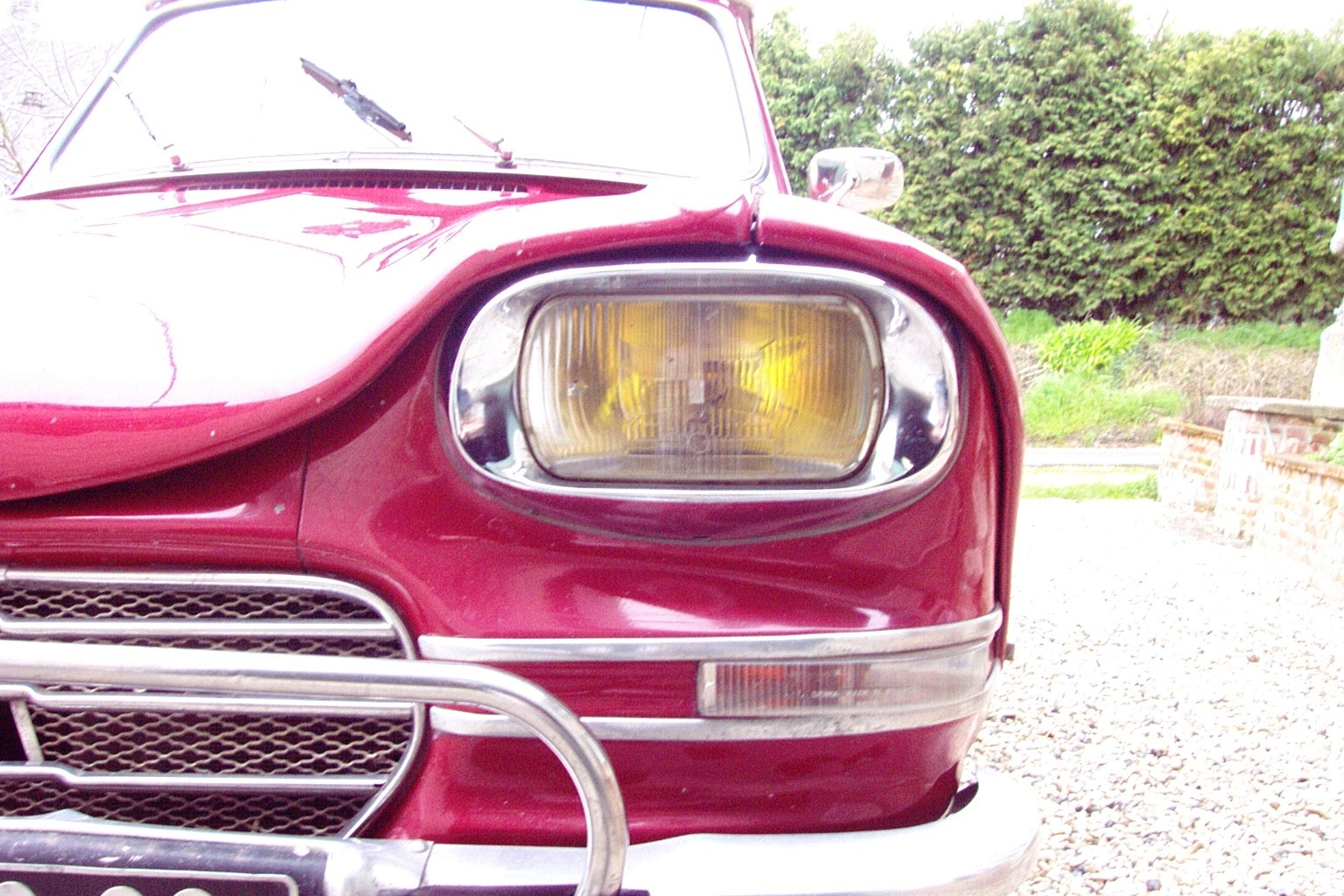
Rectangular headlamp with Selective yellow bulb on Citroën Ami 6

There was no requirement in Europe for headlamps of standardized size or shape, and lamps could be designed in any shape and size, as long as the lamps met the engineering and performance requirements contained in the applicable European safety standards. Rectangular headlamps were first used in 1960, developed by Hella for the German Ford Taunus P3 and by Cibié for the Citroën Ami 6. They were prohibited in the United States where round lamps were required until 1975. Another early headlamp styling concept involved conventional round lamps faired into the car's bodywork with aerodynamic glass covers, such as those on the 1961 Jaguar E-Type, and on pre-1967 VW Beetles.

==== Headlamp styling in the United States, 1940–1983 ====
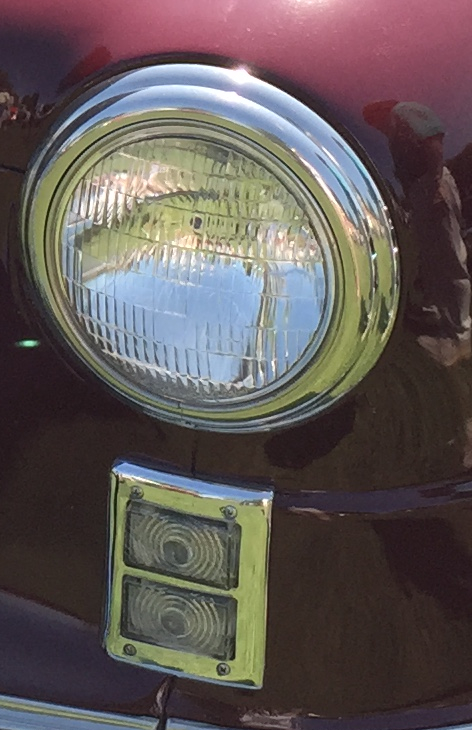
U.S. standard 7-inch headlamp combining low and high beam with turn signal lights below on a 1949 Nash 600

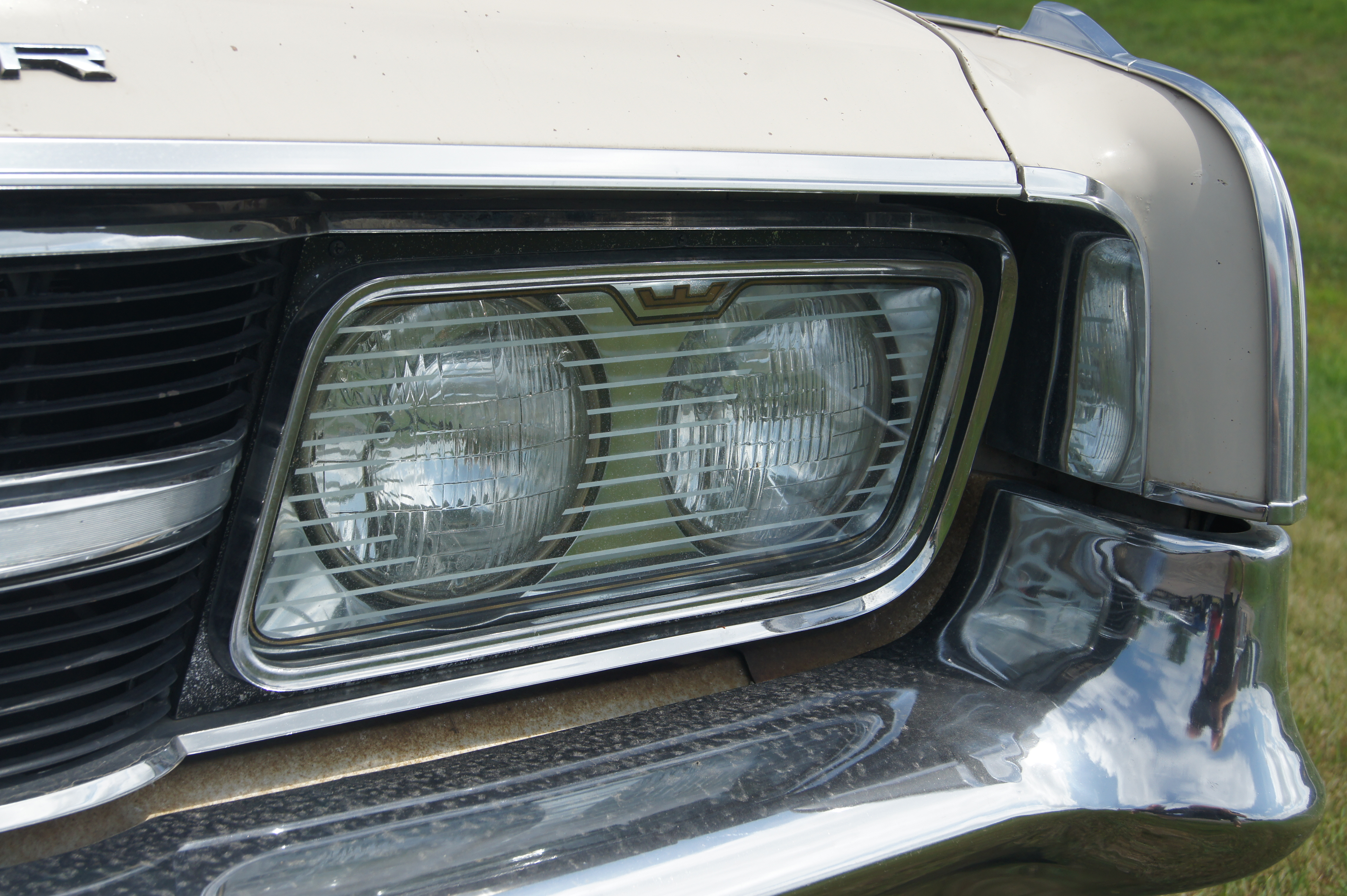
Glass-covered 5¾" sealed beam headlamps on a 1965 Chrysler 300

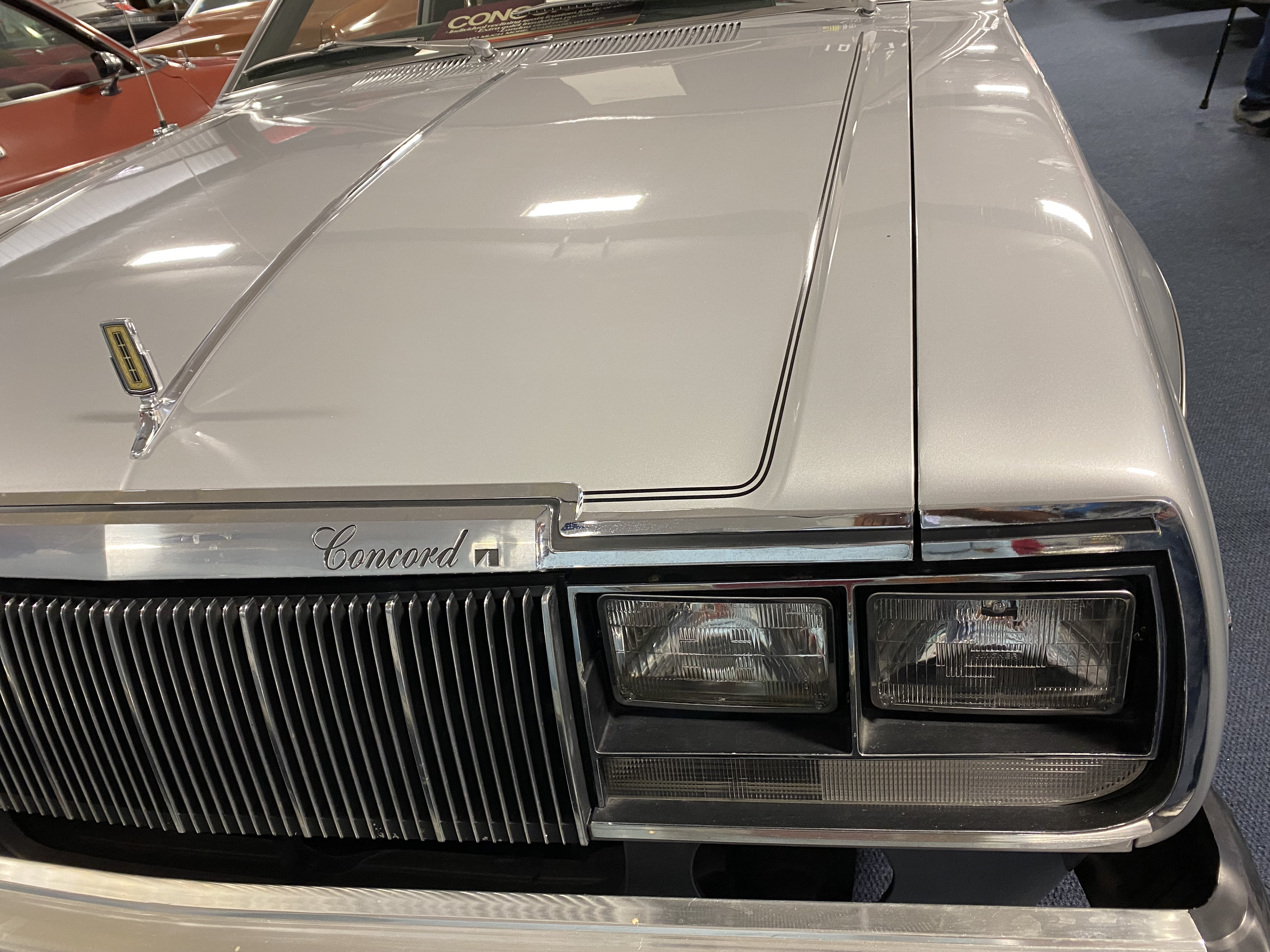
Rectangular sealed-beam headlamps with turn signal light below on a 1979 AMC Concord

Headlight design in the U.S. changed very little from 1940 to 1983.

In 1940, a consortium of state motor vehicle administrators standardized upon a system of two 7 in (178 mm) round sealed beam headlamps on all vehicles—the only system allowed for 17 years. This requirement eliminated problems of tarnished reflectors by sealing them together with the bulbs. It also made aiming the headlight beams simpler and eliminated non-standard bulbs and lamps.

The Tucker 48 included a defining "cyclops-eye" feature: a third center-mounted headlight connected to the car's steering mechanism. It illuminated only if the steering was moved more than ten degrees off center and the high beams were turned on.

A system of four round lamps, rather than two, one high/low and one high-beam 5 3/4 in (146 mm) sealed beam on each side of the vehicle, was introduced on some 1957 Cadillac, Chrysler, DeSoto, and Nash models in states that permitted the new system. Separate low and high beam lamps eliminated the need for compromise in lens design and filament positioning required in a single unit. Other cars followed suit when all states permitted the new lamps by the time the 1958 models were brought to market. The four-lamp system permitted more design flexibility and improved low and high beam performance. Auto stylists, such as Virgil Exner, carried out design studies with the low beams in their conventional outboard location, and the high beams vertically stacked at the centerline of the car, but no such designs reached volume production.

An example arrangement includes the stacking of two headlamps on each side, with low beams above high beams. The Nash Ambassador used this arrangement in the 1957 model year. Pontiac used this design starting in the 1963 model year; American Motors, Ford, Cadillac, and Chrysler followed two years later. Also in the 1965 model year, the Buick Riviera had concealable stacked headlamps. Various Mercedes models sold in America used this arrangement because their home-market replaceable-bulb headlamps were illegal in the US.

In the late 1950s and early 1960s, some Lincoln, Buick, and Chrysler cars had the headlamps arranged diagonally with the low-beam lamps outboard and above the high-beam lamps. British cars, including the Gordon-Keeble, Jensen CV8, Triumph Vitesse, and Bentley S3 Continental, used such an arrangement as well.

In 1968, the newly initiated Federal Motor Vehicle Safety Standard 108 required all vehicles to have either the twin or quad round sealed beam headlamp system and prohibited any decorative or protective element in front of an operating headlamp. Glass-covered headlamps like those used on the Jaguar E-Type, pre-1968 VW Beetle, 1965 Chrysler and Imperial models, Porsche 356, Citroën DS, and Ferrari Daytona were no longer permitted, and vehicles had to be equipped with uncovered headlamps for the US market. This made it difficult for vehicles with headlamp configurations designed for good aerodynamic performance to achieve it in their US-market configurations.

The FMVSS 108 was amended in 1974 to permit rectangular sealed-beam headlamps. This allowed manufacturers flexibility to lower the hoods on new cars. These could be placed in horizontal arrays or in vertically stacked pairs. As previously with round lamps, the US permitted only two standardized sizes of rectangular sealed-beam lamp: A system of two 200 by 142 mm (7.9 by 5.6 in) high/low beam units corresponding to the existing 7-inch round format, or a system of four 165 by 100 mm (6.5 by 3.9 in) units, two high/low and two high-beam. corresponding to the existing 5 3/4 in (146 mm) round format.

The rectangular headlamp design became so prevalent in U.S.-made cars that only a few models continued using round headlamps by 1979.

==== International headlamp styling, 1983–present ====
In 1983, granting a 1981 petition from Ford Motor Company, the US headlamp regulations were amended to allow replaceable-bulb, nonstandard-shape, architectural headlamps with aerodynamic lenses that could for the first time be made of hard-coated polycarbonate. This allowed the first US-market car since 1939 with replaceable bulb headlamps: the 1984 Lincoln Mark VII. These composite headlamps were sometimes referred to as "Euro" headlamps since aerodynamic headlamps were common in Europe. Though conceptually similar to European headlamps with non-standardized shape and replaceable-bulb construction, these headlamps conform to the headlamp design, construction, and performance specifications of US Federal Motor Vehicle Safety Standard 108 rather than the internationalized European safety standards used outside North America. Nevertheless, this change to US regulations made it possible for headlamp styling in the US market to move closer to that in Europe.

==== Hidden headlamps ====
Pop-up headlamps on a Mazda 323F

Hidden headlamps were introduced in 1936, on the Cord 810/812. They were mounted in the front fenders, which were smooth until the lights were cranked out—each with its own small dash-mounted crank—by the operator. They aided aerodynamics when the headlamps were not in use and were among the Cord's signature design features.

Later hidden headlamps require one or more vacuum-operated servos and reservoirs, with associated plumbing and linkage, or electric motors, geartrains and linkages to raise the lamps to an exact position to assure correct aiming despite ice, snow, and age. Some hidden headlamp designs, such as those on the Saab Sonett III, used a lever-operated mechanical linkage to raise the headlamps into position.

During the 1960s and 1970s, many notable sports cars used this feature such as the Chevrolet Corvette (C3), Ferrari Berlinetta Boxer and Lamborghini Countach as they allowed low bonnet lines but raised the lights to the required height, but since 2004 no modern volume-produced car models use hidden headlamps because they present difficulties in complying with pedestrian-protection provisions added to international auto safety regulations regarding protuberances on car bodies to minimize injury to pedestrians struck by cars.

Some hidden headlamps themselves do not move, but rather are covered when not in use by panels designed to blend in with the car's styling. When the lamps are switched on, the covers are swung out of the way, usually downward or upward, for example on the 1992 Jaguar XJ220. The door mechanism may be actuated by vacuum pots, as on some Ford vehicles of the late 1960s through early 1980s such as the 1967–1970 Mercury Cougar, or by an electric motor as on various Chrysler products of the middle 1960s through late 1970s such as the 1966–1967 Dodge Charger.

== Regulations and requirements ==
Modern headlamps are electrically operated, positioned in pairs, one or two on each side of the front of a vehicle. A headlamp system is required to produce a low and a high beam, which may be produced by multiple pairs of single-beam lamps or by a pair of dual-beam lamps, or a mix of single-beam and dual-beam lamps. High beams cast most of their light straight ahead, maximizing seeing distance but producing too much glare for safe use when other vehicles are present on the road. Because there is no special control of upward light, high beams also cause backdazzle from fog, rain and snow due to the retroreflection of the water droplets. Low beams have stricter control of upward light, and direct most of their light downward and either rightward (in right-traffic countries) or leftward (in left-traffic countries), to provide forward visibility without excessive glare or backdazzle.

=== Low beam ===
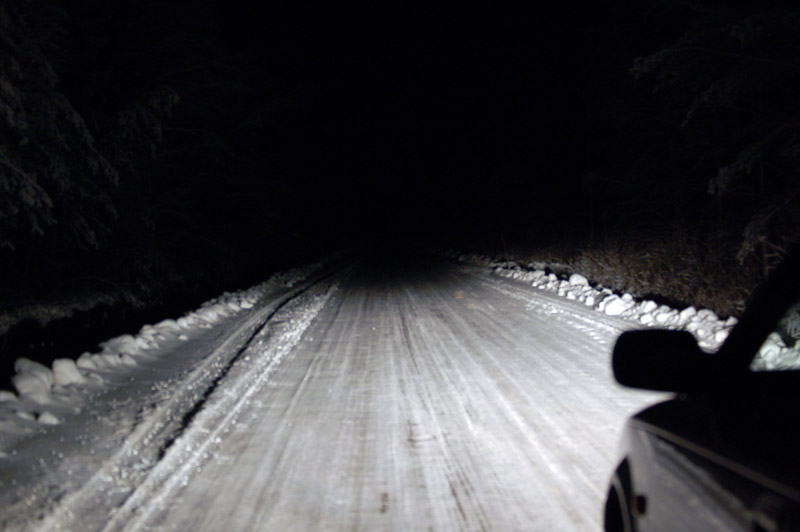
ECE dipped/low beam

Asymmetrical low beam illumination of road surface – right-traffic beam shown

Low beam (dipped beam, passing beam, meeting beam) headlamps provide a distribution of light designed to provide forward and lateral illumination, with limits on light directed towards the eyes of other road users to control glare. This beam is intended for use whenever other vehicles are present ahead, whether oncoming or being overtaken.

The international ECE Regulations for filament headlamps and for high-intensity discharge headlamps specify a beam with a sharp, asymmetric cutoff preventing significant amounts of light from being cast into the eyes of drivers of preceding or oncoming cars. Control of glare is less strict in the North American SAE beam standard contained in FMVSS / CMVSS 108.

=== High beam ===
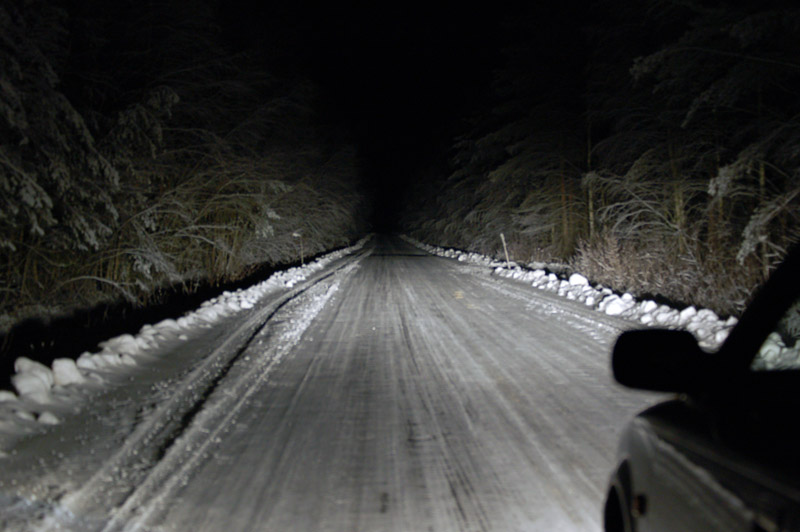
ECE high/main beam

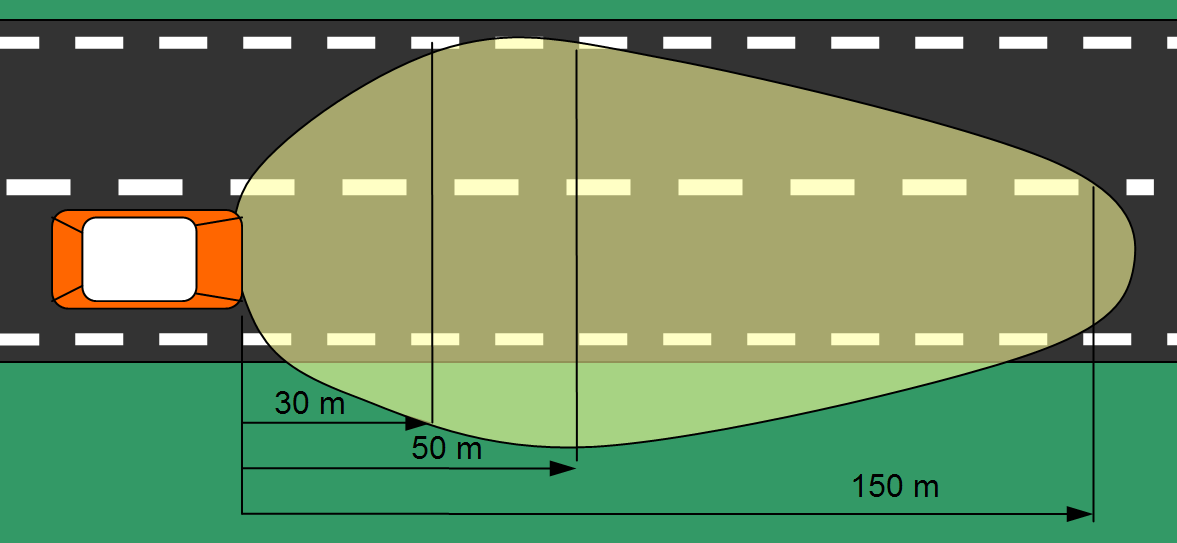
Symmetrical high beam illumination of road surface

High beam (main beam, driving beam, full beam) headlamps provide a bright, center-weighted distribution of light with no particular control of light directed towards other road users' eyes. As such, they are only suitable for use when alone on the road, as the glare they produce will dazzle other drivers.

International ECE Regulations permit higher-intensity high-beam headlamps than are allowed under North American regulations.

=== Compatibility with traffic directionality ===
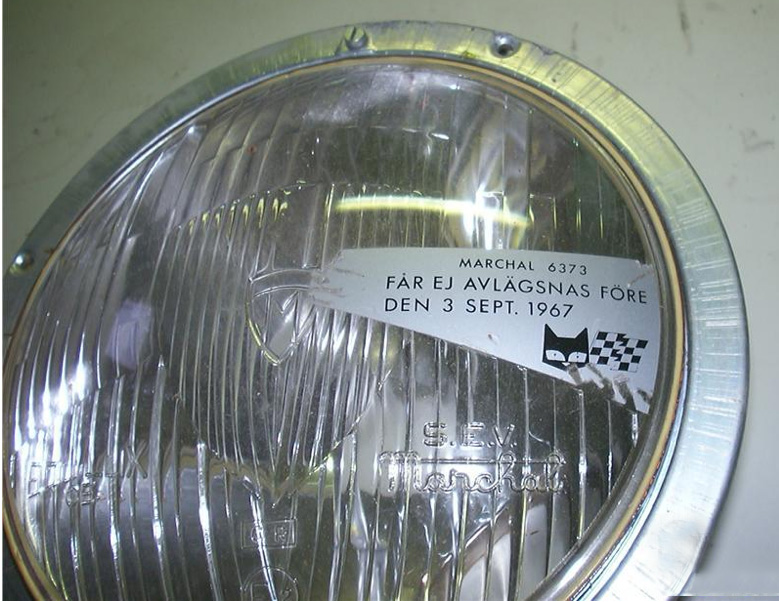
Headlamp sold in Sweden not long before Dagen H changeover from left to right hand traffic. Opaque decal blocks the lens portion for low beam upkick to the right, and bears the warning: "Not to be removed before 3 September 1967".

Most low-beam headlamps are specifically designed for use on only one side of the road. Headlamps for use in left-traffic countries have low-beam headlamps that "dip to the left"; the light is distributed with a downward/leftward bias to show the driver the road and signs ahead without blinding oncoming traffic. Headlamps for right-traffic countries have low beams that "dip to the right", with most of their light directed downward/rightward.

Within Europe, when driving a vehicle with right-traffic headlamps in a left-traffic country or vice versa for a limited time (as for example on vacation or in transit), it is a legal requirement to adjust the headlamps temporarily so that their wrong-side beam distribution does not dazzle oncoming drivers. This may be achieved by methods including adhering opaque decals or prismatic lenses to a designated part of the lens. Some projector-type headlamps can be made to produce a proper left- or right-traffic beam by shifting a lever or other movable element in or on the lamp assembly. Many tungsten (pre-halogen) European-code headlamps made in France by Cibié, Marchal, and Ducellier could be adjusted to produce either a left- or a right-traffic low beam by means of a two-position bulb holder.

Because wrong-side-of-road headlamps blind oncoming drivers and do not adequately light the driver's way, and blackout strips and adhesive prismatic lenses reduce the safety performance of the headlamps, some countries require all vehicles registered or used on a permanent or semi-permanent basis within the country to be equipped with headlamps designed for the correct traffic-handedness. North American vehicle owners sometimes privately import and install Japanese-market (JDM) headlamps on their car in the mistaken belief that the beam performance will be better, when in fact such misapplication is quite hazardous and illegal.

=== Adequacy ===
Vehicle headlamps have been found unable to illuminate an assured clear distance ahead at speeds above 60 km/h (40 mph). It may be unsafe and, in a few areas, illegal to drive above this speed at night.

=== Use in daytime ===
Some countries require automobiles to be equipped with daytime running lights (DRL) to increase the conspicuity of vehicles in motion during the daytime. Regional regulations govern how the DRL function may be provided. In Canada, the DRL function required on vehicles made or imported since 1990 can be provided by the headlamps, the fog lamps, steady-lit operation of the front turn signals, or by special daytime running lamps. Functionally dedicated daytime running lamps not involving the headlamps are required on all new cars first sold in the European Union since February 2011. In addition to the EU and Canada, countries requiring DRL include Albania, Argentina, Bosnia and Herzegovina, Colombia (no more from Aug/2011), Iceland, Israel, Macedonia, Norway, Moldova, Russia, Serbia, and Uruguay.

=== Construction, performance, and aim ===
There are two different beam pattern and headlamp construction standards in use in the world: The ECE standard, which is allowed or required in virtually all industrialized countries except the United States, and the SAE standard that is mandatory only in the US. Japan formerly had bespoke lighting regulations similar to the US standards, but for the left side of the road. However, Japan now adheres to the ECE standard. The differences between the SAE and ECE headlamp standards are primarily in the amount of glare permitted toward other drivers on low beam (SAE permits much more glare), the minimum amount of light required to be thrown straight down the road (SAE requires more), and the specific locations within the beam at which minimum and maximum light levels are specified.

ECE low beams are characterized by a distinct horizontal "cutoff" line at the top of the beam. Below the line is bright, and above is dark. On the side of the beam facing away from oncoming traffic (right in right-traffic countries, left in left-traffic countries), this cutoff sweeps or steps upward to direct light to road signs and pedestrians. SAE low beams may or may not have a cutoff, and if a cutoff is present, it may be of two different general types: VOL, which is conceptually similar to the ECE beam in that the cutoff is located at the top of the left side of the beam and aimed slightly below horizontal, or VOR, which has the cutoff at the top of the right side of the beam and aimed at the horizon.

Proponents of each headlamp system decry the other as inadequate and unsafe: US proponents of the SAE system claim that the ECE low beam cutoff gives short seeing distances and inadequate illumination for overhead road signs, while international proponents of the ECE system claim that the SAE system produces too much glare. Comparative studies have repeatedly shown that there is little or no overall safety advantage to either SAE or ECE beams; the two systems' acceptance and rejection by various countries is based primarily on which system is already in use.

In North America, the design, performance, and installation of all motor vehicle lighting devices are regulated by Federal and Canada Motor Vehicle Safety Standard 108, which incorporates SAE technical standards. Elsewhere in the world, ECE internationalized regulations are in force either by reference or by incorporation in individual countries' vehicular codes.

US laws required sealed beam headlamps on all vehicles between 1940 and 1983, and other countries such as Japan, United Kingdom, and Australia also made extensive use of sealed beams. In most other countries, and in the US since 1984, replaceable-bulb headlamps predominate.

Headlamps must be kept in proper aim. Regulations for aim vary from country to country and from beam specification to beam specification. In the US, SAE standard headlamps are aimed without regard to headlamp mounting height. This gives vehicles with high-mounted headlamps a seeing distance advantage, at the cost of increased glare to drivers in lower vehicles. By contrast, ECE headlamp aim angle is linked to headlamp mounting height, to give all vehicles roughly equal seeing distance and all drivers roughly equal glare.

==== Light colour ====
===== White =====
Headlamps are generally required to produce white light, according to both ECE and SAE standards. ECE Regulation 48 currently requires new vehicles to be equipped with headlamps emitting white light. Different headlamp technologies produce different characteristic types of white light; the white specification is quite large and permits a wide range of apparent colour from warm white (with a brown-orange-amber-yellow cast) to cold white (with a blue-violet cast).

===== Selective yellow =====
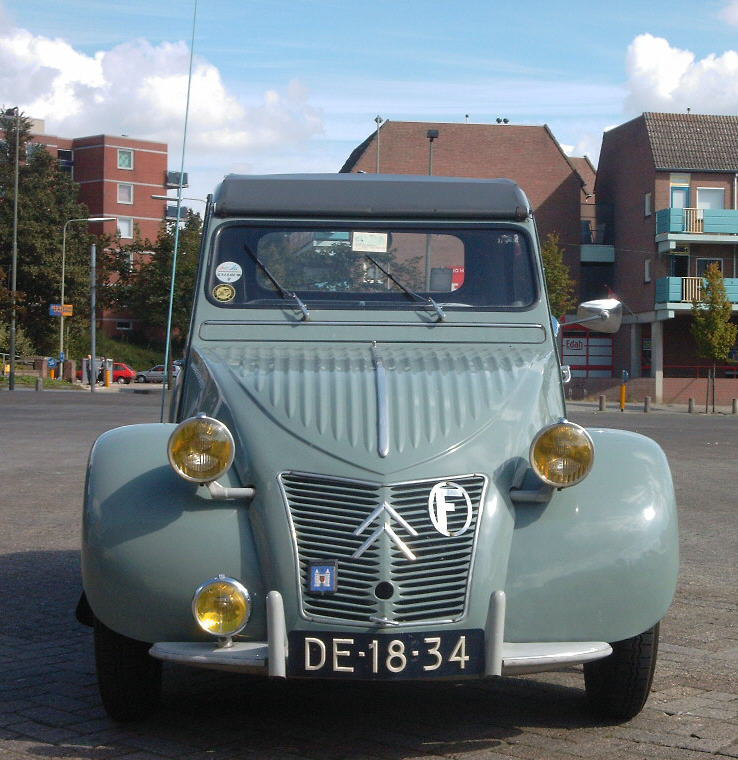
1957 Citroën 2CV with selective yellow headlamps and auxiliary lamp

Previous ECE regulations also permitted selective yellow light. A research experiment done in the UK in 1968 using tungsten (non-halogen) lamps found that visual acuity is about 3% better with selective yellow headlamps than with white ones of equal intensity. Research done in the Netherlands in 1976 concluded that yellow and white headlamps are equivalent as regards traffic safety, though yellow light causes less discomfort glare than white light. Researchers note that tungsten filament lamps emit only a small amount of the blue light blocked by a selective-yellow filter, so such filtration makes only a small difference in the characteristics of the light output, and suggest that headlamps using newer kinds of sources such as metal halide (HID) bulbs may, through filtration, give off less visually distracting light while still having greater light output than halogen ones.

Selective yellow headlamps are no longer common, but are permitted in various countries throughout Europe as well as in non-European locales such as South Korea, Japan and New Zealand. In Iceland, yellow headlamps are allowed and the vehicle regulations in Monaco still officially require selective yellow light from all vehicles' low beam and high beam headlamps, and fog lamps if present.

In France, a statute passed in November 1936 based on advice from the Central Commission for Automobiles and for Traffic in General, required selective yellow headlights to be fitted. The mandate for yellow headlamps was enacted to reduce driver fatigue from discomfort glare. The requirement initially applied to vehicles registered for road use after April 1937, but was intended to extend to all vehicles through retrofitting of selective yellow lights on older vehicles, from the start of 1939. Later stages of the implementation were disrupted in September 1939 by the outbreak of war.

The French yellow-light mandate was based on observations by the French Academy of Sciences in 1934, when the academy recorded that the selective yellow light was less dazzling than white light and that the light diffused less in fog than green or blue lights. Yellow light was obtained by dint of yellow glass for the headlight bulb or lens, a yellow coating on a colourless bulb, lens, or reflector, or a yellow filter between the bulb and the lens. Filtration losses reduced the emitted light intensity by about 18 percent, which might have contributed to the reduced glare.

The mandate was in effect until December 1992, so for many years yellow headlights visually marked French-registered cars wherever they were seen, though some French drivers are said to have switched to white headlamps despite the requirement for yellow ones.

The requirement was criticised as a trade barrier in the automobile sector; French politician Jean-Claude Martinez described it as a protectionist law.

Formal research found, at best, a small improvement in visual acuity with yellow rather than white headlights, and French automaker Peugeot estimated that white headlamps produce 20 to 30 percent more light—though without explaining why this estimate was larger than the 15% to 18% value measured in formal research—and wanted drivers of their cars to get the benefits of extra illumination. More generally, country-specific vehicle technical regulations in Europe were regarded as a costly nuisance. In a survey published in 1988, automakers gave a range of responses when asked what it cost to supply a car with yellow headlamps for France. General Motors and Lotus said there was no additional cost, Rover said the additional cost was marginal, and Volkswagen said yellow headlamps added 28 Deutsche Marks to the cost of vehicle production. Addressing the French requirement for yellow lights (among other country-specific lighting requirements) was undertaken as part of an effort toward common vehicle technical standards throughout the European Community. A provision in EU Council Directive 91/663, issued on 10 December 1991, specified white headlamps for all new vehicle type-approvals granted by the EC after 1 January 1993 and stipulated that from that date EC (later EU) member states would not be permitted to refuse entry of a vehicle meeting the lighting standards contained in the amended document—so France would no longer be able to refuse entry to a vehicle with white headlights. The directive was adopted unanimously by the council, and hence with France's vote.

Though no longer required in France, selective yellow headlamps remain legal there; the current regulation stipulates that "every motor vehicle must be equipped, at the front, with two or four lights, creating in a forward direction selective yellow or white light permitting efficient illumination of the road at night for a distance, in clear conditions, of 100 metres".

== Optical systems ==
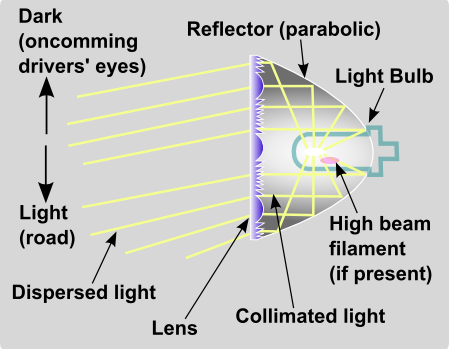
Lens optics, side view. Light is dispersed vertically (shown) and laterally (not shown).

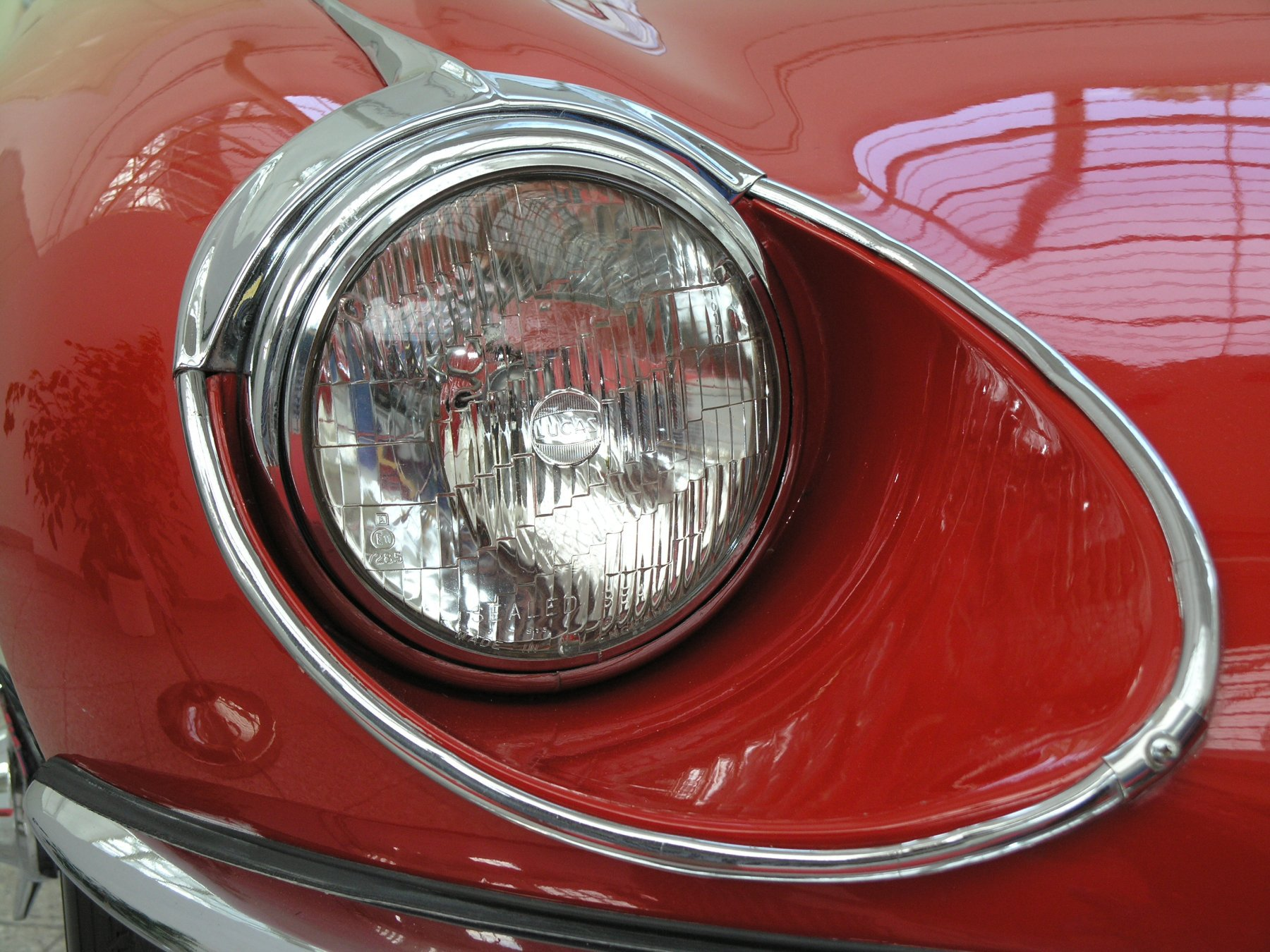
A 7 in (180 mm) round sealed-beam headlamp with lens optics on a Jaguar E-type. The flutes and prisms spread and distribute the light collected by the reflector.

=== Reflector lamps ===
==== Lens optics ====
A light source (filament or arc) is placed at or near the focus of a reflector, which may be parabolic or of non-parabolic complex shape. Fresnel and prism optics moulded into the headlamp lens refract (shift) parts of the light laterally and vertically to provide the required light distribution pattern. Most sealed-beam headlamps have lens optics.

==== Reflector optics ====
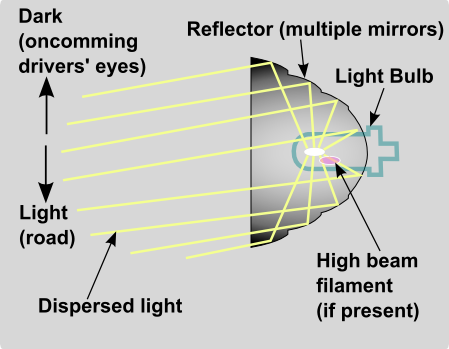
Reflector optics, side view

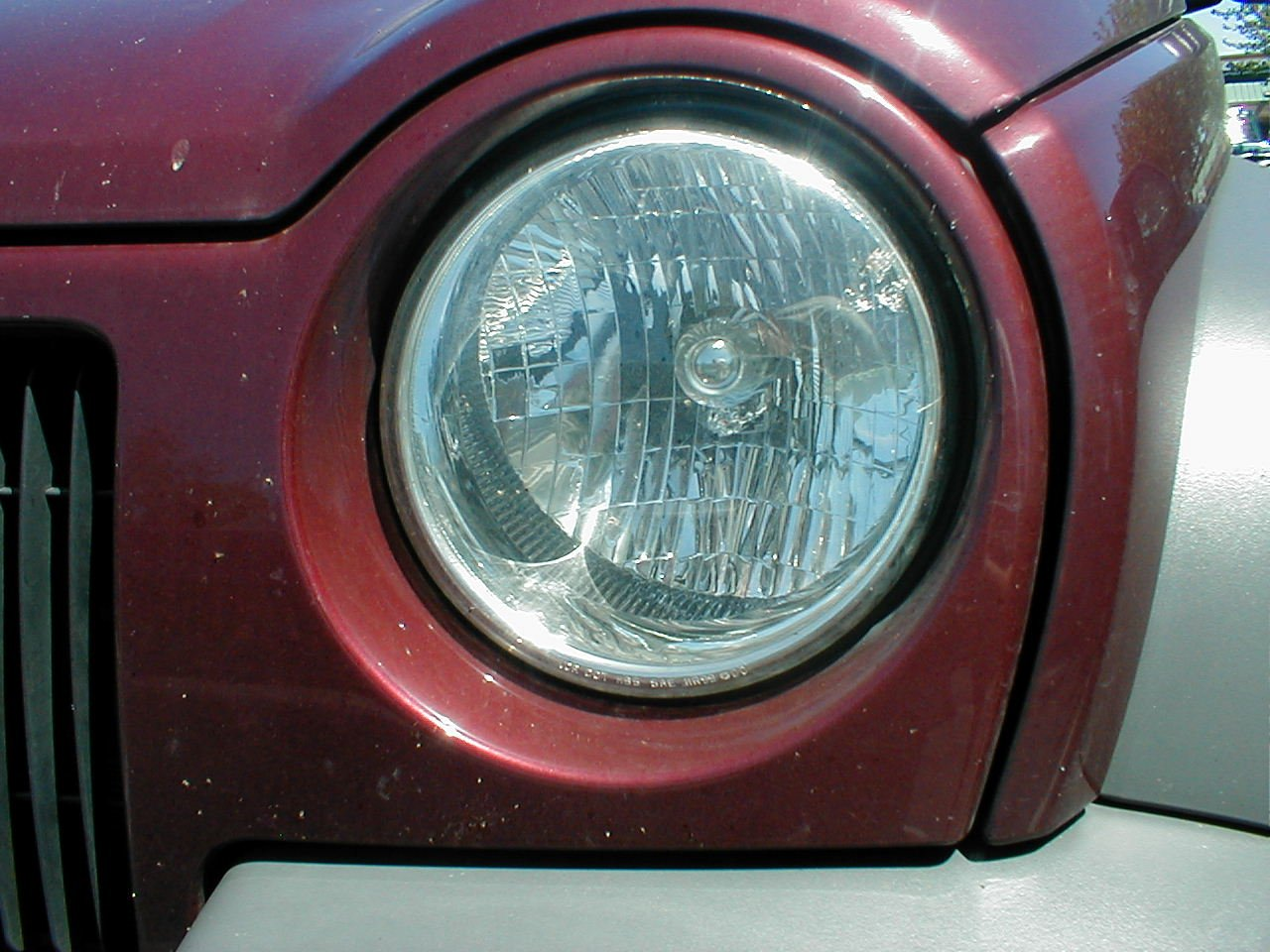
A reflector-optic headlamp on a Jeep Liberty. The clear front cover lens serves only a protective function.

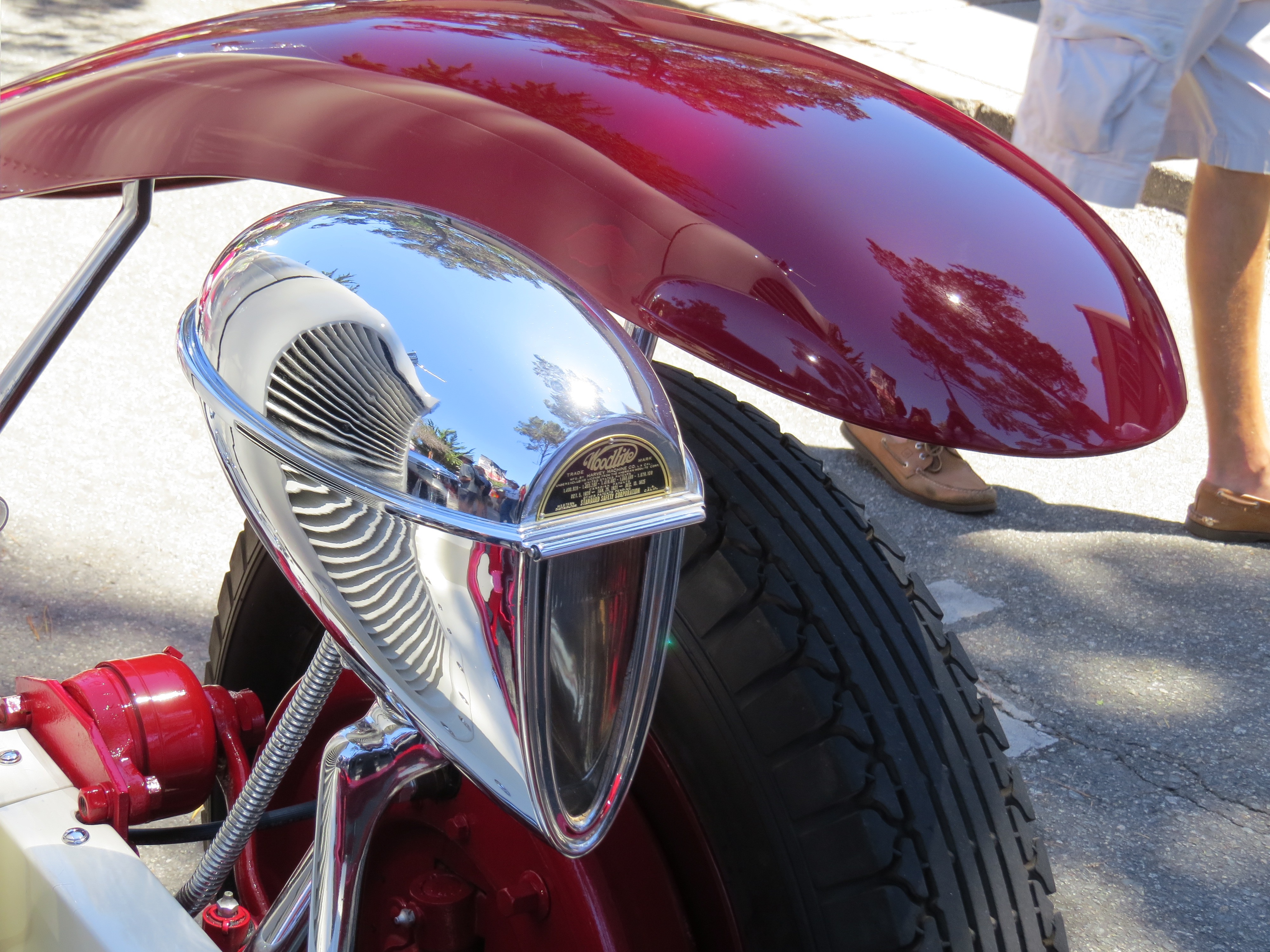
Woodlite reflector-optic headlamp (1926−1932) US-Patent 1.660.699.

Starting in the 1980s, headlamp reflectors began to evolve beyond the simple stamped steel parabola. The 1983 Austin Maestro was the first vehicle equipped with Lucas-Carello's homofocal reflectors, which comprised parabolic sections of different focal length to improve the efficiency of light collection and distribution. CAD technology allowed the development of reflector headlamps with nonparabolic, complex-shape reflectors. First commercialised by Valeo under their Cibié brand, these headlamps would revolutionise automobile design.

The 1987 US-market Dodge Monaco/Eagle Premier twins and European Citroën XM were the first cars with complex-reflector headlamps with faceted optic lenses. General Motors' Guide Lamp division in America had experimented with clear-lens complex-reflector lamps in the early 1970s and achieved promising results, but the US-market 1990 Honda Accord was first with clear-lens multi-reflector headlamps; these were developed by Stanley in Japan.

The optics to distribute the light in the desired pattern are designed into the reflector itself, rather than into the lens. Depending on the development tools and techniques in use, the reflector may be engineered from the start as a bespoke shape, or it may start as a parabola standing in for the size and shape of the completed package. In the latter case, the entire surface area is modified so as to produce individual segments of specifically calculated, complex contours. The shape of each segment is designed such that their cumulative effect produces the required light distribution pattern.

Modern reflectors are commonly made of compression-moulded or injection moulded plastic, though glass and metal optic reflectors also exist. The reflective surface is vapour deposited aluminum, with a clear overcoating to prevent the extremely thin aluminium from oxidizing. Extremely tight tolerances must be maintained in the design and production of complex-reflector headlamps.

===== Dual-beam reflector headlamps =====
Night driving is difficult and dangerous due to the blinding glare of headlights from oncoming traffic. Headlamps that satisfactorily illuminate the road ahead without causing glare have long been sought. The first solutions involved resistance-type dimming circuits, which decreased the intensity of the headlamps. This yielded to tilting reflectors, and later to dual-filament bulbs with a high and a low beam.

In a two-filament headlamp, there can only be one filament exactly at the focal point of the reflector. There are two primary means of producing two different beams from a two-filament bulb in a single reflector.

====== American system ======
One filament is located at the focal point of the reflector. The other filament is shifted axially and radially away from the focal point. In most 2-filament sealed beams and in 2-filament replaceable bulbs of type 9004, 9007, and H13, the high-beam filament is at the focal point and the low-beam filament is off focus. For use in right-traffic countries, the low-beam filament is positioned slightly upward, forward, and leftward of the focal point, so that when it is energized, the beam is widened and shifted slightly downward and rightward of the headlamp axis. Transverse-filament bulbs such as the 9004 can only be used with the filaments horizontal, but axial-filament bulbs can be rotated or "clocked" by the headlamp designer to optimize the beam pattern or to affect the traffic-handedness of the low beam. The latter is accomplished by clocking the low-beam filament in an upward-forward-leftward position to produce a right-traffic low beam, or in an upward-forward-rightward position to produce a left-traffic low beam.

The opposite tactic has also been employed in certain two-filament sealed beams. Placing the low beam filament at the focal point to maximize light collection by the reflector, and positioning the high beam filament slightly rearward-rightward-downward of the focal point. The relative directional shift between the two beams is the same with either technique – in a right-traffic country, the low beam is slightly downward-rightward and the high beam is slightly upward-leftward, relative to one another – but the lens optics must be matched to the filament placements selected.

====== European system ======
The traditional European method of achieving low and high beams from a single bulb involves two filaments along the axis of the reflector. The high beam filament is on the focal point, while the low beam filament is approximately 1 cm forward of the focal point and 3 mm above the axis. Below the low beam filament is a cup-shaped shield (called a "Graves shield") spanning an arc of 165°. When the low beam filament is illuminated, this shield casts a shadow on the corresponding lower area of the reflector, blocking downward light rays that would otherwise strike the reflector and be cast above the horizon. The bulb is rotated (or "clocked") within the headlamp to position the Graves shield so as to allow light to strike a 15° wedge of the lower half of the reflector. This is used to create the upsweep or upstep characteristic of ECE low beam light distributions. The bulb's rotative position within the reflector depends on the type of beam pattern to be produced and the traffic directionality of the market for which the headlamp is intended.

This system was first used with the tungsten incandescent Bilux/Duplo R2 bulb of 1954, and later with the halogen H4 bulb of 1971. In 1992, US regulations were amended to permit the use of H4 bulbs redesignated HB2 and 9003, and with slightly different production tolerances stipulated. These are physically and electrically interchangeable with H4 bulbs. Similar optical techniques are used, but with different reflector or lens optics to create a US beam pattern rather than a European one.

Each system has its advantages and disadvantages. The American system historically permitted a greater overall amount of light within the low beam, since the entire reflector and lens area is used, but at the same time, the American system has traditionally offered much less control over upward light that causes glare, and for that reason has been largely rejected outside the US. In addition, the American system makes it difficult to create markedly different low and high beam light distributions. The high beam is usually a rough copy of the low beam, shifted slightly upward and leftward. The European system traditionally produced low beams containing less overall light, because only 60% of the reflector's surface area is used to create the low beam. However, low beam focus and glare control are easier to achieve. In addition, the lower 40% of the reflector and lens are reserved for high beam formation, which facilitates the optimization of both low and high beams.

====== Developments in the 1990s and 2000s ======
Complex-reflector technology in combination with new bulb designs such as H13 is enabling the creation of European-type low and high beam patterns without the use of a Graves Shield, while the 1992 US approval of the H4 bulb has made traditionally European 60% / 40% optical area divisions for low and high beam common in the US. Therefore, the difference in active optical area and overall beam light content no longer necessarily exists between US and ECE beams. Dual-beam HID headlamps employing reflector technology have been made using adaptations of both techniques.

=== Projector (polyellipsoidal) lamps ===
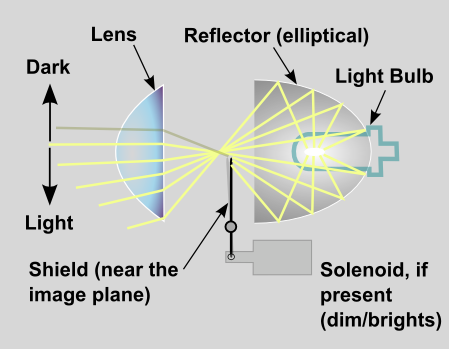
Projector optics, side view

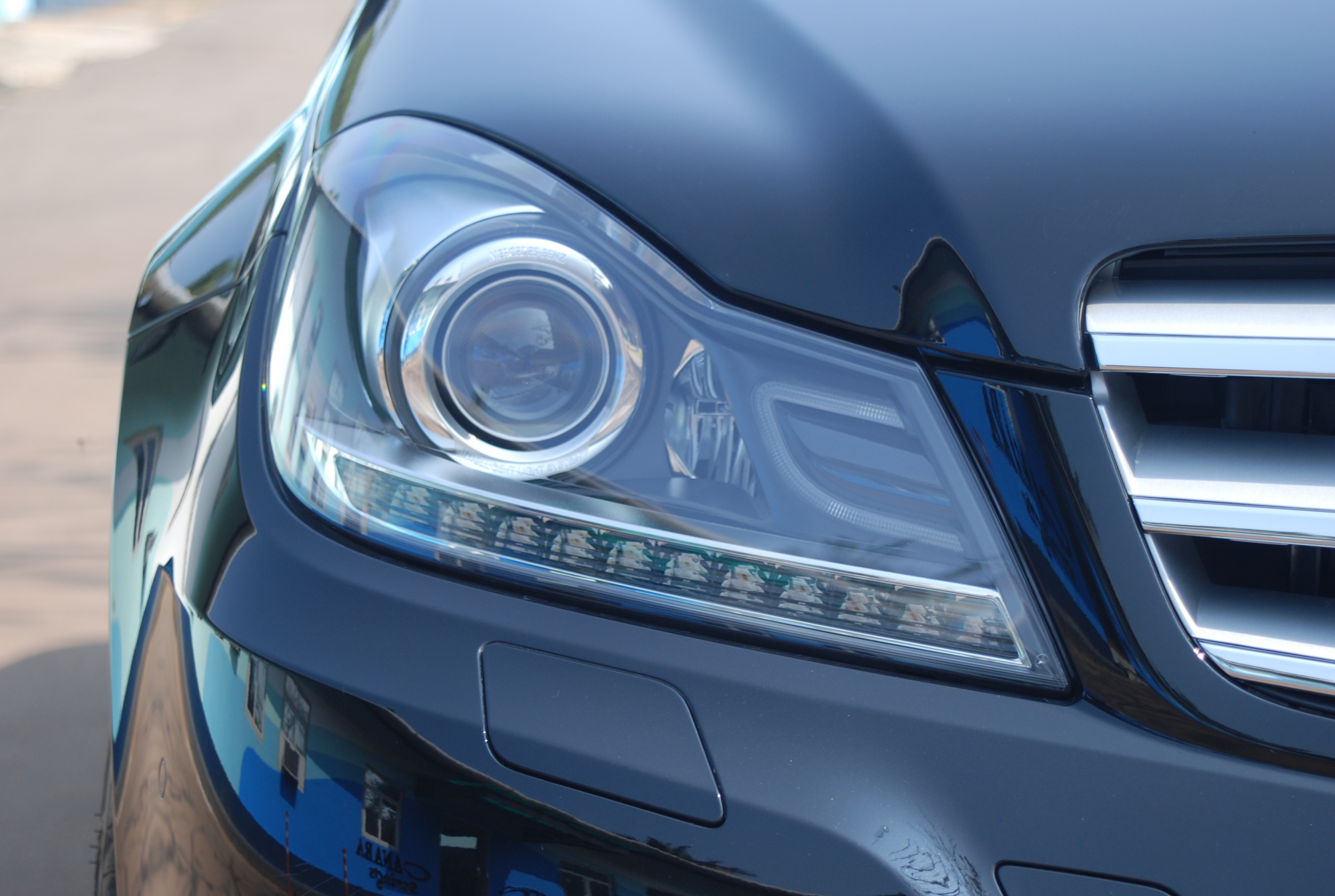
Projector headlamps on a Mercedes Benz C-Class

In this system a filament is located at one focus of an ellipsoidal reflector and has a condenser lens at the front of the lamp. A shade is located at the image plane, between the reflector and lens, and the projection of the top edge of this shade provides the low-beam cutoff. The shape of the shade edge and its exact position in the optical system determine the shape and sharpness of the cutoff. The shade may be lowered by a solenoid actuated pivot to provide a low beam, and removed from the light path for the high beam. Such optics are known as BiXenon or BiHalogen projectors. If the cutoff shade is fixed in the light path, separate high-beam lamps are required. The condenser lens may have minor Fresnel lens or other surface treatments to reduce cutoff sharpness. Modern condenser lenses incorporate optical features specifically designed to direct some light upward towards the locations of retroreflective overhead road signs.

Hella introduced ellipsoidal optics for acetylene headlamps in 1911, but following the electrification of vehicle lighting, this optical technique wasn't used for many decades. The first modern polyellipsoidal (projector) automotive lamp was the Super-Lite, an auxiliary headlamp produced in a joint venture between Chrysler Corporation and Sylvania and optionally installed in 1969 and 1970 full-size Dodge automobiles. It used an 85-watt transverse-filament tungsten-halogen bulb and was intended as a mid-beam, to extend the reach of the low beams during turnpike travel when low beams alone were inadequate but high beams would produce excessive glare.

Projector main headlamps appeared in 1981 on the Audi Quartz, a concept car designed by Pininfarina for Geneva Auto Salon. Developed more or less simultaneously in Germany by Hella and Bosch and in France by Cibié, the projector low beam permitted accurate beam focus and a much smaller-diameter optical package, though a much deeper one, for any given beam output. The 1986 BMW 7 Series (E32) was the first volume-production car to use polyellipsoidal low beam headlamps. The main disadvantage of this type of headlamp is the need to accommodate the physical depth of the assembly, which may extend far back into the engine compartment.

== Light sources ==
=== Tungsten ===
The first electric headlamp light source was the tungsten filament, operating in a vacuum or inert-gas atmosphere inside the headlamp bulb or sealed beam. Compared to newer-technology light sources, tungsten filaments give off small amounts of light relative to the power they consume. Also, during the normal operation of such lamps, tungsten boils off the surface of the filament and condenses on the bulb glass, blackening it. This reduces the light output of the filament and blocks some of the light that would pass through an unblackened bulb glass, though blackening was less of a problem in sealed beam units; their large interior surface area minimized the thickness of the tungsten accumulation. For these reasons, plain tungsten filaments are all but obsolete in automotive headlamp service.

=== Tungsten-halogen ===
Tungsten-halogen technology (also called "quartz-halogen", "quartz-iodine", "iodine cycle", etc.) increases the effective luminous efficacy of a tungsten filament: when operating at a higher filament temperature which results in more lumens output per watt input, a tungsten-halogen lamp has a much longer brightness lifetime than similar filaments operating without the halogen regeneration cycle. At equal luminosity, the halogen-cycle bulbs also have longer lifetimes. European-designed halogen headlamp light sources are generally configured to provide more light at the same power consumption as their lower-output plain tungsten counterparts. By contrast, many US-based designs are configured to reduce or minimize the power consumption while keeping light output above the legal minimum requirements; some US tungsten-halogen headlamp light sources produce less initial light than their non-halogen counterparts. A slight theoretical fuel economy benefit and reduced vehicle construction cost through lower wire and switch ratings were the claimed benefits when American industry first chose how to implement tungsten-halogen technology. There was an improvement in seeing distance with US halogen high beams, which were permitted for the first time to produce 150,000 candela (cd) per vehicle, double the non-halogen limit of 75,000 cd but still well shy of the international European limit of 225,000 cd. After replaceable halogen bulbs were permitted in US headlamps in 1983, the development of US bulbs continued to favor long bulb life and low power consumption, while European designs continued to prioritise optical precision and maximum output.

The H1 lamp was the first tungsten-halogen headlamp light source. It was introduced in 1962 by a consortium of European bulb and headlamp makers. This bulb has a single axial filament that consumes 55 watts at 12.0 volts, and produces 1550 lumens ±15% when operated at 13.2 V. H2 (55 W @ 12.0 V, 1820 lm @ 13.2 V) followed in 1964, and the transverse-filament H3 (55 W @ 12.0 V, 1450 lm ±15%) in 1966. H1 still sees wide use in low beams, high beams and auxiliary fog and driving lamps, as does H3. The H2 is no longer a current type, since it requires an intricate bulb holder interface to the lamp, has a short life and is difficult to handle. For those reasons, H2 was withdrawn from ECE Regulation 37 for use in new lamp designs (though H2 bulbs are still manufactured for replacement purposes in existing lamps), but H1 and H3 remain current and these two bulbs were legalised in the United States in 1993. More recent single-filament bulb designs include the H7 (55 W @ 12.0 V, 1500 lm ±10% @ 13.2 V), H8 (35 W @ 12.0 V, 800 lm ±15% @ 13.2 V), H9 (65 W @ 12.0 V, 2100 lm ±10% @ 13.2 V), and H11 (55 W @ 12.0 V, 1350 lm ±10% @ 13.2 V). 24-volt versions of many bulb types are available for use in trucks, buses, and other commercial and military vehicles.

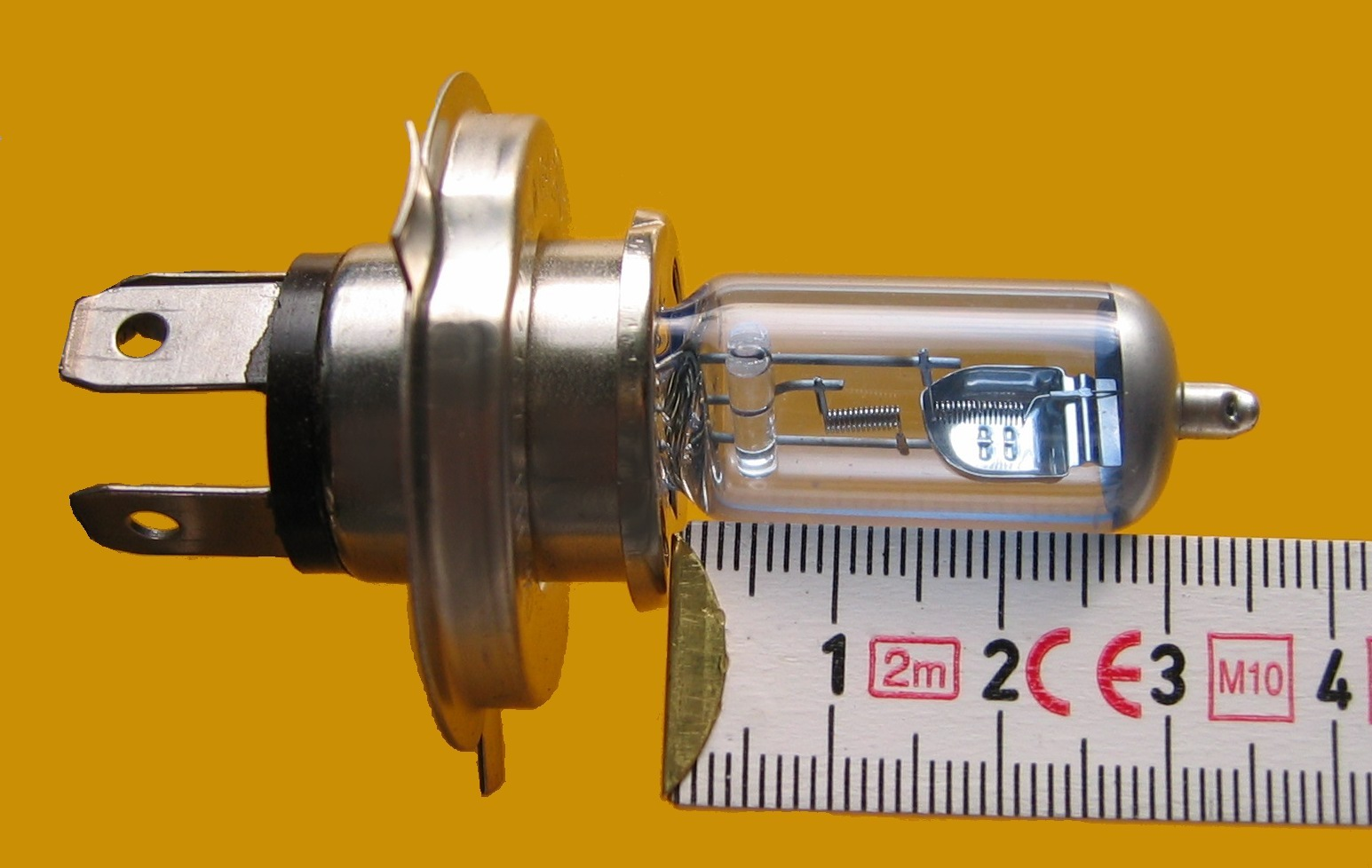
H4 bulb (cm)

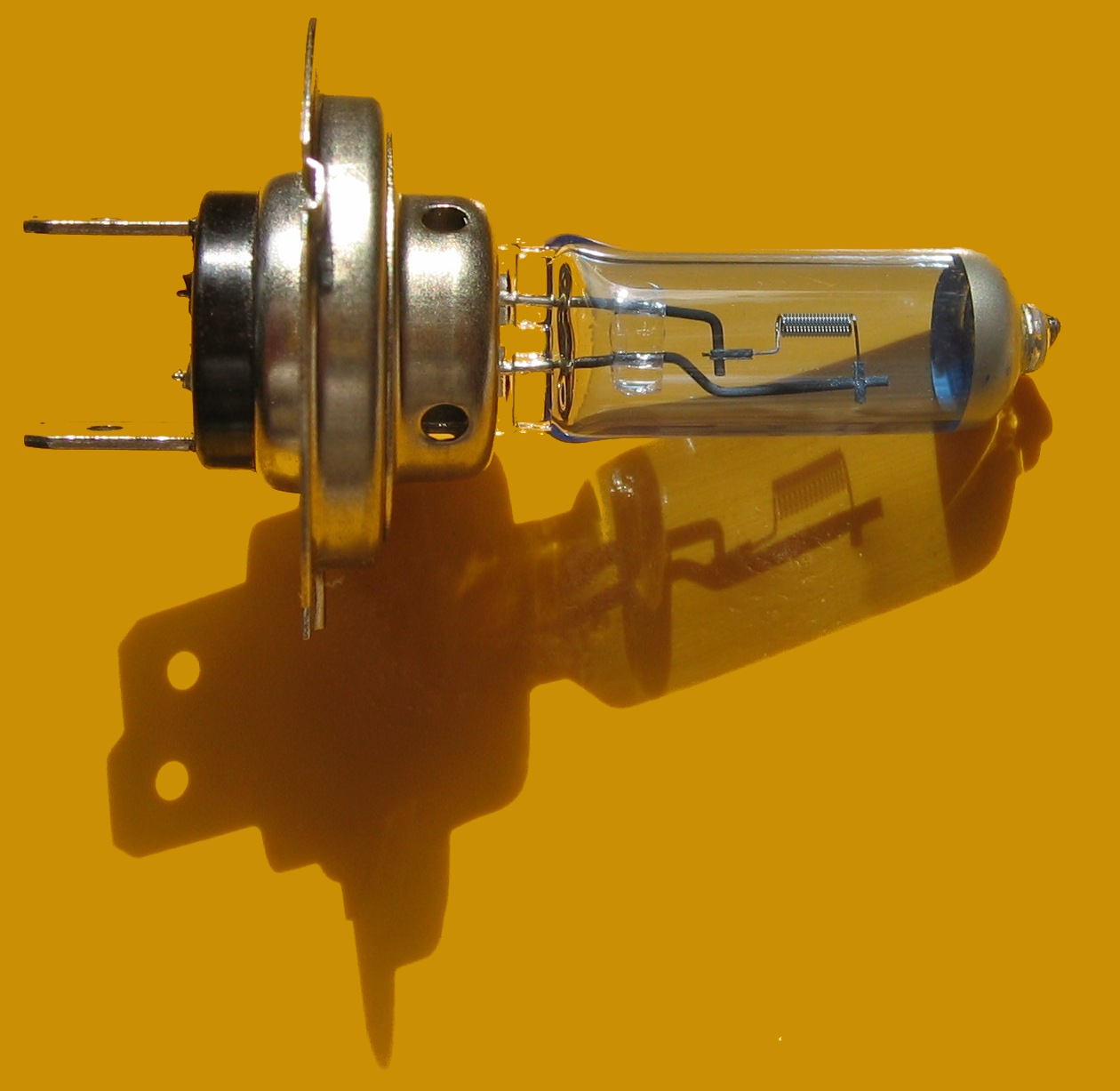
H7 bulb

The first dual-filament halogen bulb to produce both a low and a high beam, the H4 (60/55 W @ 12 V, 1650/1000 lm ±15% @ 13.2 V), was released in 1971 and quickly became the predominant headlamp bulb throughout the world except in the United States, where the H4 is still not legal for automotive use. In 1989, the Americans created their own standard for a bulb called HB2: almost identical to H4 except with more stringent constraints on filament geometry and positional variance, and power consumption and light output expressed at the US test voltage of 12.8V.

The first US halogen headlamp bulb, introduced in 1983, was the HB1/9004. It is a 12.8-volt, transverse dual-filament design that produces 700 lumens on low beam and 1200 lumens on high beam. The 9004 is rated for 65 watts (high beam) and 45 watts (low beam) at 12.8 volts. Other US approved halogen bulbs include the HB3 (65 W, 12.8 V), HB4 (55 W, 12.8 V), and HB5 (65/55 watts, 12.8 V). All of the European-designed and internationally approved bulbs except H4 are presently approved for use in headlamps complying with US requirements.

==== Halogen infrared reflective (HIR) ====
A further development of the tungsten-halogen bulb has a dichroic coating that passes visible light and reflects infrared radiation. The glass in such a bulb may be spherical or tubular. The reflected infrared radiation strikes the filament located at the center of the glass envelope, heating the filament to a greater degree than can be achieved through resistive heating alone. The superheated filament emits more light without an increase in power consumption.

=== High-intensity discharge (HID) ===
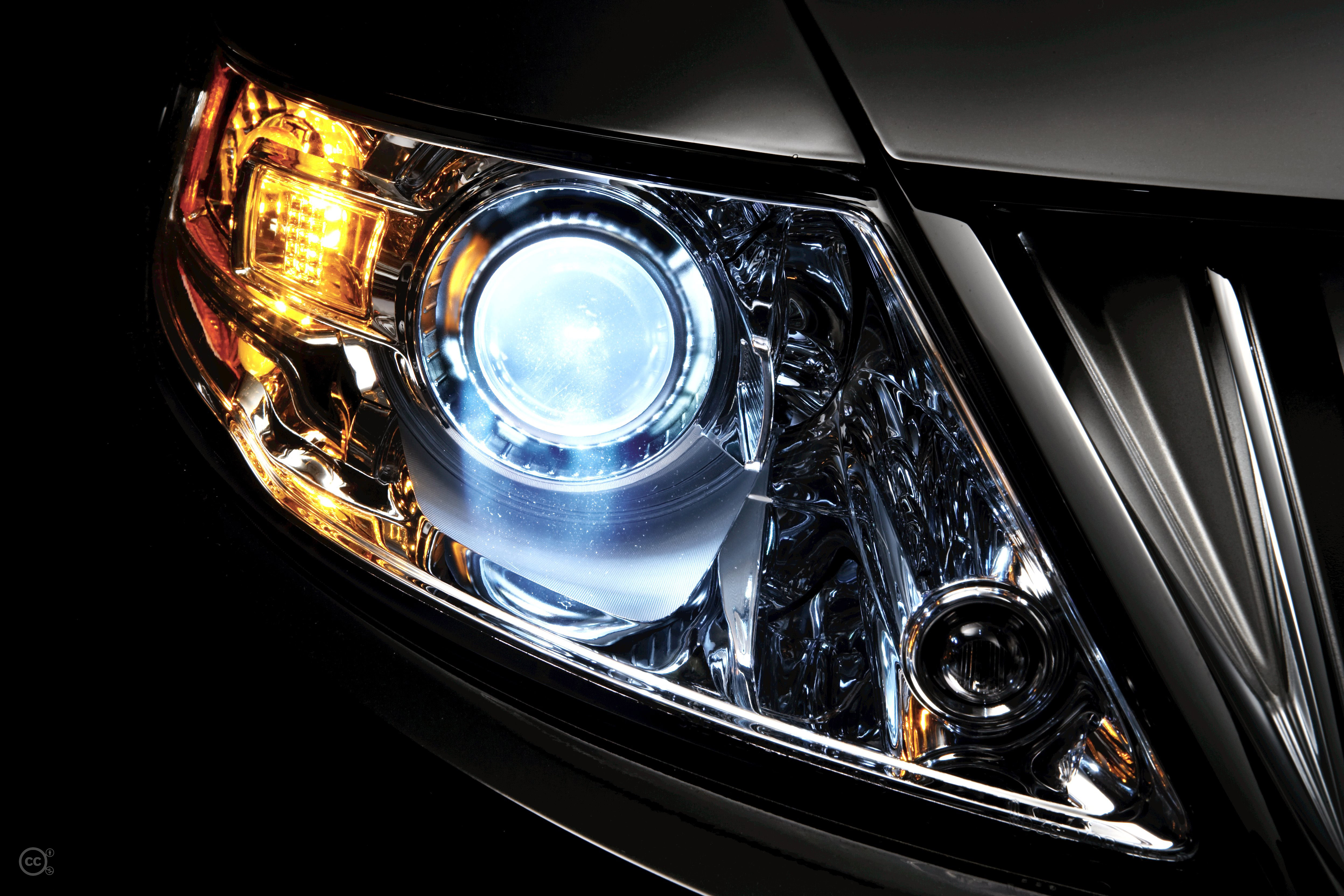
HID projector low beam headlamp illuminated on a Lincoln MKS

High-intensity discharge lamps (HID) produce light with an electric arc rather than a glowing filament. The high intensity of the arc comes from metallic salts that are vaporized within the arc chamber. These lamps have a higher efficacy than tungsten lamps. Because of the increased amounts of light available from HID lamps relative to halogen bulbs, HID headlamps producing a given beam pattern can be made smaller than halogen headlamps producing a comparable beam pattern. Alternatively, the larger size can be retained, in which case the HID headlamp can produce a more robust beam pattern.

Automotive HID may be generically called "xenon headlamps", though they are actually metal-halide lamps that contain xenon gas. The xenon gas allows the lamps to produce minimally adequate light immediately upon start, and shortens the run-up time. The usage of argon, as is commonly done in street lights and other stationary metal-halide lamp applications, causes lamps to take several minutes to reach their full output.

The light from HID headlamps can exhibit a distinct bluish tint when compared with tungsten-filament headlamps.

==== Retrofitment ====
When a halogen headlamp is retrofitted with an HID bulb, light distribution and output are altered. In the United States, vehicle lighting that does not conform to FMVSS 108 is not street legal. Glare will be produced and the headlamp's type approval or certification becomes invalid with the altered light distribution, so the headlamp is no longer street-legal in some locales. In the US, suppliers, importers and vendors that offer non-compliant kits are subject to civil fines. By October 2004, the NHTSA had investigated 24 suppliers and all resulted in termination of sale or recalls.

In Europe and the many non-European countries applying ECE Regulations, even HID headlamps designed as such must be equipped with lens cleaning and automatic self-leveling systems, except on motorcycles. These systems are usually absent on vehicles not originally equipped with HID lamps.

==== History ====
In 1992 the first production low beam HID headlamps were manufactured by Hella and Bosch beginning in 1992 for optional availability on the BMW 7 Series. This first system uses a built-in, non-replaceable bulb without a UV-blocking glass shield or touch-sensitive electrical safety cutout, designated D1 – a designation that would be recycled years later for a wholly different type of lamp. The AC ballast is about the size of a building brick. In 1996 the first American-made effort at HID headlamps was on the 1996–98 Lincoln Mark VIII, which uses reflector headlamps with an unmasked, integral-ignitor lamp made by Sylvania and designated Type 9500. This was the only system to operate on DC, since reliability proved inferior to the AC systems. The Type 9500 system was not used on any other models, and was discontinued after Osram's takeover of Sylvania in 1997. All HID headlamps worldwide presently use the standardized AC-operated bulbs and ballasts. In 1999 the first worldwide HID headlights for both low and high beam were introduced on the Mercedes-Benz CL-Class (C215).

==== Operation ====
HID headlamp bulbs do not run on low-voltage DC current, so they require a ballast with either an internal or external ignitor. The ignitor is integrated into the bulb in D1 and D3 systems, and is either a separate unit or part of the ballast in D2 and D4 systems. The ballast controls the current to the bulb. The ignition and ballast operation proceeds in three stages:

1. Ignition: a high voltage pulse is used to produce an electrical arc – in a manner similar to a spark plug – which ionizes the xenon gas, creating a conducting channel between the tungsten electrodes. Electrical resistance is reduced within the channel, and current flows between the electrodes.
2. Initial phase: the bulb is driven with controlled overload. Because the arc is operated at high power, the temperature in the capsule rises quickly. The metallic salts vaporize, and the arc is intensified and made spectrally more complete. The resistance between the electrodes also falls; the electronic ballast control gear registers this and automatically switches to continuous operation.
3. Continuous operation: all metal salts are in the vapor phase, the arc has attained its stable shape, and the luminous efficacy has attained its nominal value. The ballast now supplies stable electrical power so the arc will not flicker. Stable operating voltage is 85 volts AC in D1 and D2 systems, 42 volts AC in D3 and D4 systems. The frequency of the square-wave alternating current is typically 400 hertz or higher.

Headlight indicator example

The command is often near the steering wheel and a specific indicator is shown on the dashboard.

==== Bulb types ====
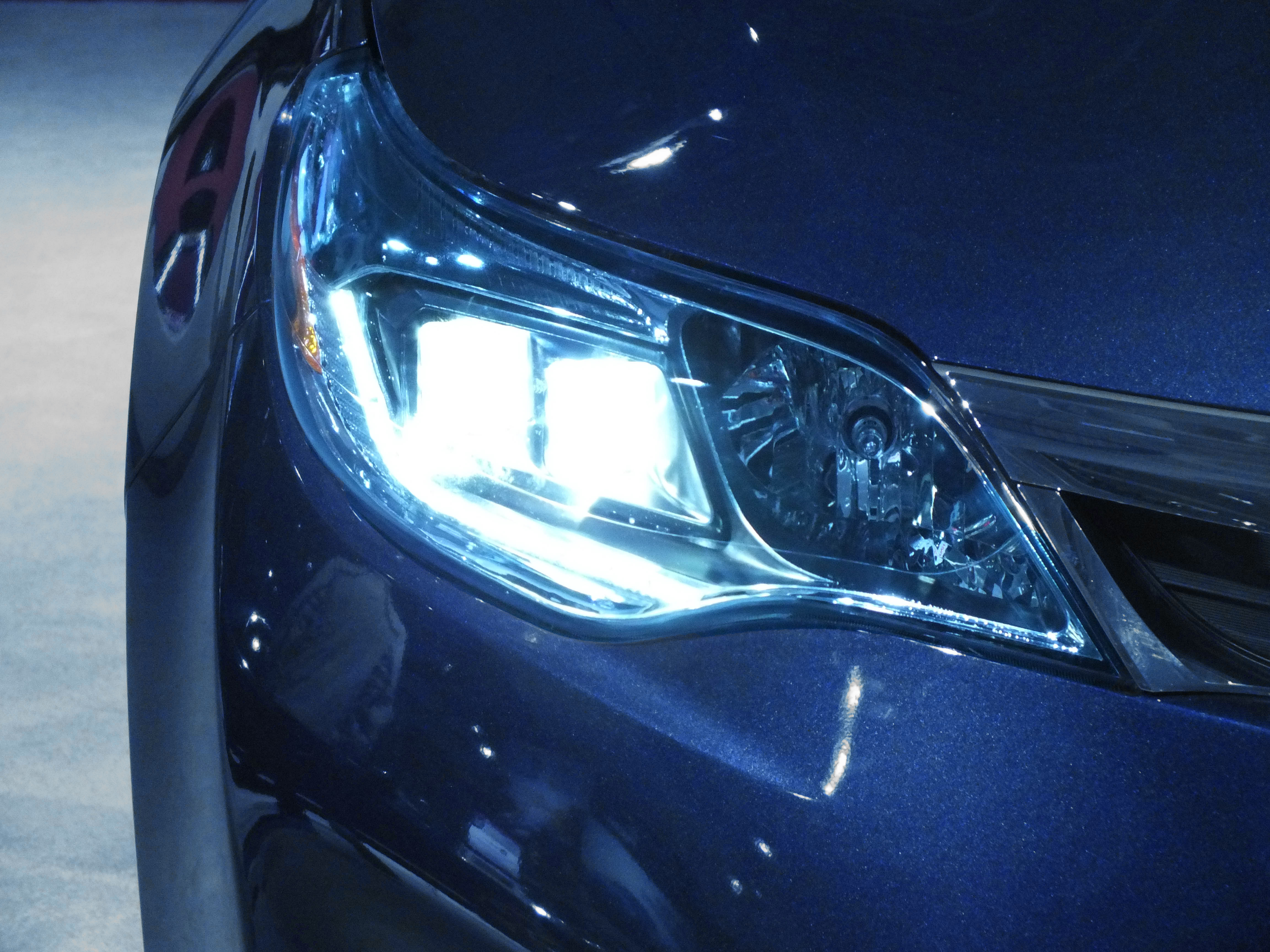
2014 Toyota Avalon headlamp with "Quadrabeam"-styled HID low beams, halogen high beams, and LED daytime running lights that also illuminate at a lower intensity to provide the front position light function

HID headlamps produce between 2,800 and 3,500 lumens from between 35 and 38 watts of electrical power, while halogen filament headlamp bulbs produce between 700 and 2,100 lumens from between 40 and 72 watts at 12.8 V.

Current-production bulb categories are D1S, D1R, D2S, D2R, D3S, D3R, D4S, and D4R. The D stands for discharge, and the number is the type designator. The final letter describes the outer shield. The arc within an HID headlamp bulb generates considerable short-wave ultraviolet (UV) light, but none of it escapes the bulb, for a UV-absorbing hard glass shield is incorporated around the bulb's arc tube. This is important to prevent degradation of UV-sensitive components and materials in headlamps, such as polycarbonate lenses and reflector hardcoats. "S" lamps – D1S, D2S, D3S, and D4S – have a plain glass shield and are primarily used in projector-type optics. "R" lamps – D1R, D2R, D3R, and D4R – are designed for use in reflector-type headlamp optics. They have an opaque mask covering specific portions of the shield, which facilitates the optical creation of the light-dark boundary (cutoff) near the top of a low-beam light distribution. Automotive HID lamps emit considerable near-UV light, despite the shield.

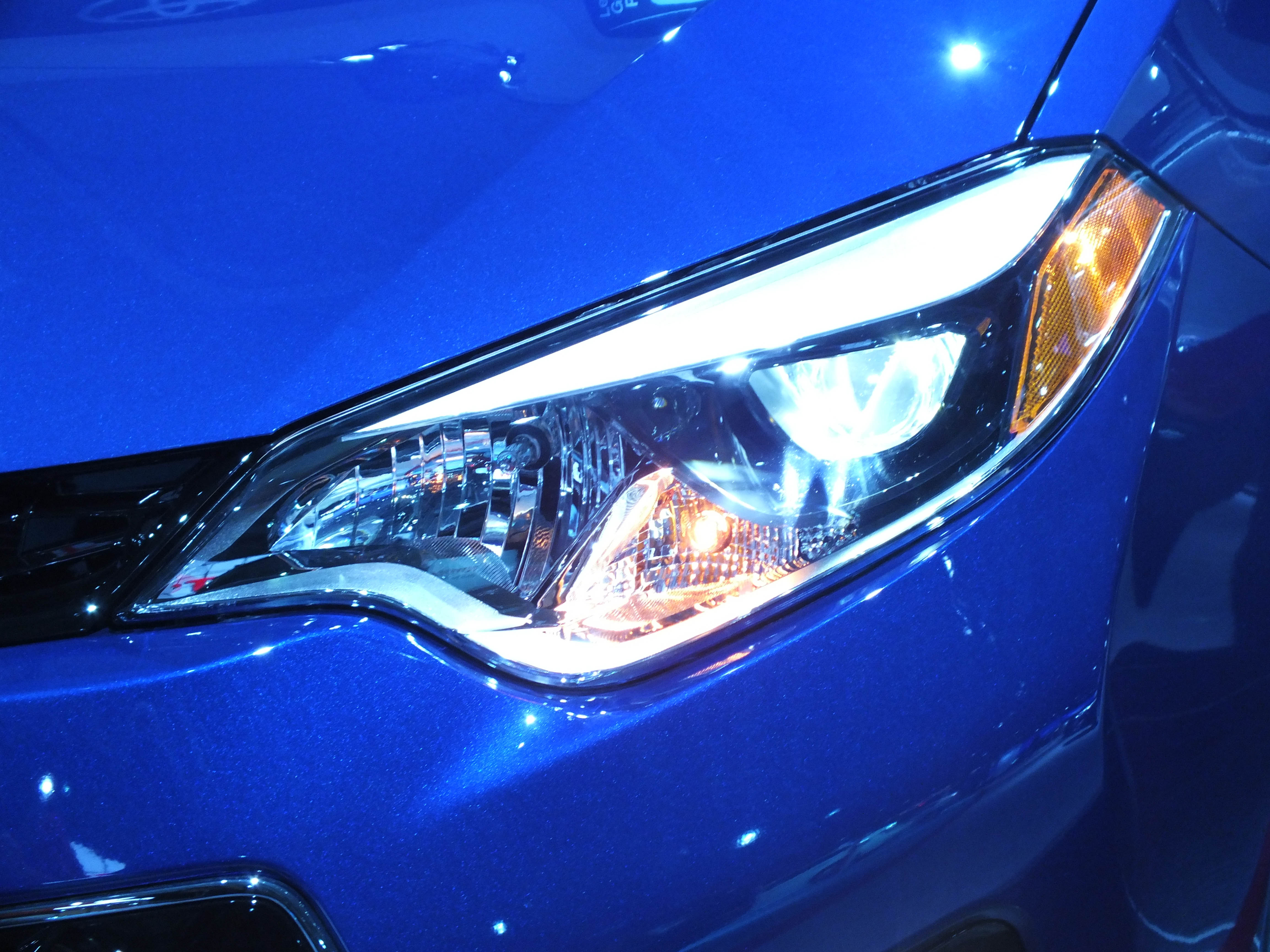
2014 Toyota Corolla The low beam features LED lighting, halogen high beams, and LED daytime running lights that also illuminate at a lower intensity to provide the front position light function

==== Color ====
The correlated color temperature of factory installed automotive HID headlamps is between 4200K while tungsten-halogen lamps are at 3000K to 3550K. The spectral power distribution (SPD) of an automotive HID headlamp is discontinuous and spikey while the SPD of a filament lamp, like that of the sun, is a continuous curve. Moreover, the color rendering index (CRI) of tungsten-halogen headlamps (98) is much closer than that of HID headlamps (~75) to standardized sunlight (100). Studies have shown no significant safety effect of this degree of CRI variation in headlighting.

==== Advantages ====
===== Increased safety =====
Automotive HID lamps offer about 3000 lumens and 90 Mcd/m^{2} versus 1400 lumens and 30 Mcd/m^{2} offered by halogen lamps. In a headlamp optic designed for use with an HID lamp, it produces more usable light. Studies have demonstrated drivers react faster and more accurately to roadway obstacles with good HID headlamps compared to halogen ones. Hence, good HID headlamps contribute to driving safety. The contrary argument is that glare from HID headlamps can reduce traffic safety by interfering with other drivers' vision.

===== Efficacy and output =====
Luminous efficacy is the measure of how much light is produced versus how much energy is consumed. HID lamps give higher efficacy than halogen lamps. The highest-intensity halogen lamps, H9 and HIR1, produce 2100 to 2530 lumens from approximately 70 watts at 13.2 volts. A D2S HID bulb produces 3200 lumens from approximately 42 watts during stable operation. The reduced power consumption means less fuel consumption, with resultant less CO_{2} emission per vehicle fitted with HID lighting (1.3 g/km assuming that 30% of an engine running time is with the lights on).

===== Longevity =====
The average service life of an HID bulb is 2000 hours, compared to between 450 and 1000 hours for a halogen lamp.

==== Disadvantages ====
===== Glare =====
Vehicles equipped with HID headlamps (except motorcycles) are required by ECE regulation 48 also to be equipped with headlamp lens cleaning systems and automatic beam leveling control. Both of these measures are intended to reduce the tendency for high-output headlamps to cause high levels of glare to other road users. In North America, ECE R48 does not apply and while lens cleaners and beam levelers are permitted, they are not required; HID headlamps are markedly less prevalent in the US, where they have produced significant glare complaints. Scientific study of headlamp glare has shown that for any given intensity level, the light from HID headlamps is 40% more glaring than the light from tungsten-halogen headlamps.

===== Mercury content =====
HID headlamp bulb types D1R, D1S, D2R, D2S and 9500 contain the toxic heavy metal mercury. The disposal of mercury-containing vehicle parts is increasingly regulated throughout the world, for example under US EPA regulations. Newer HID bulb designs D3R, D3S, D4R, and D4S which are in production since 2004 contain no mercury, but are not electrically or physically compatible with headlamps designed for previous bulb types.

===== Cost =====
HID headlamps are significantly more costly to produce, install, purchase, and repair. The extra cost of the HID lights may exceed the fuel cost savings through their reduced power consumption, though some of this cost disadvantage is offset by the longer lifespan of the HID bulb relative to halogen bulbs.

=== LED ===
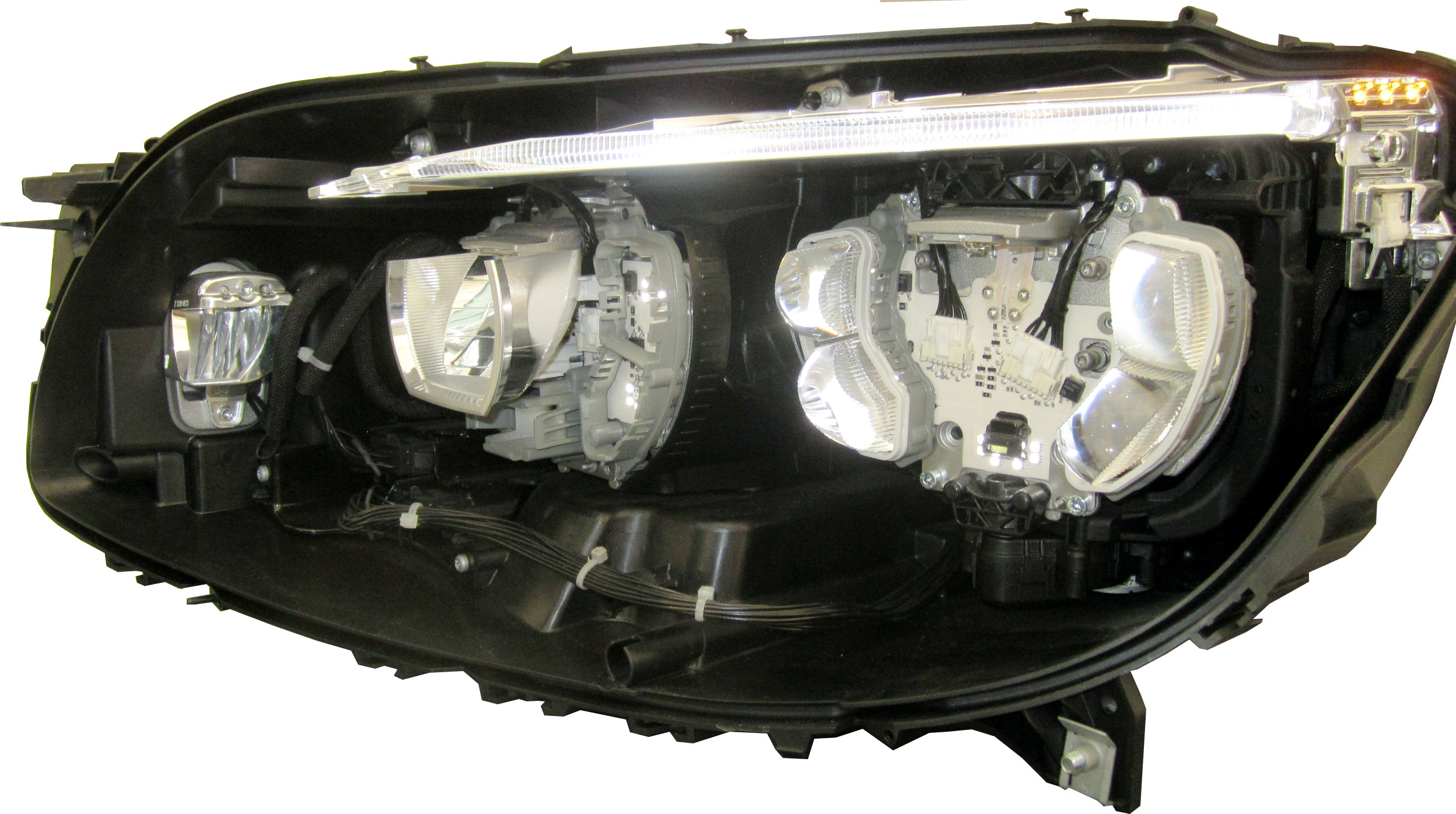
LED headlamp inside

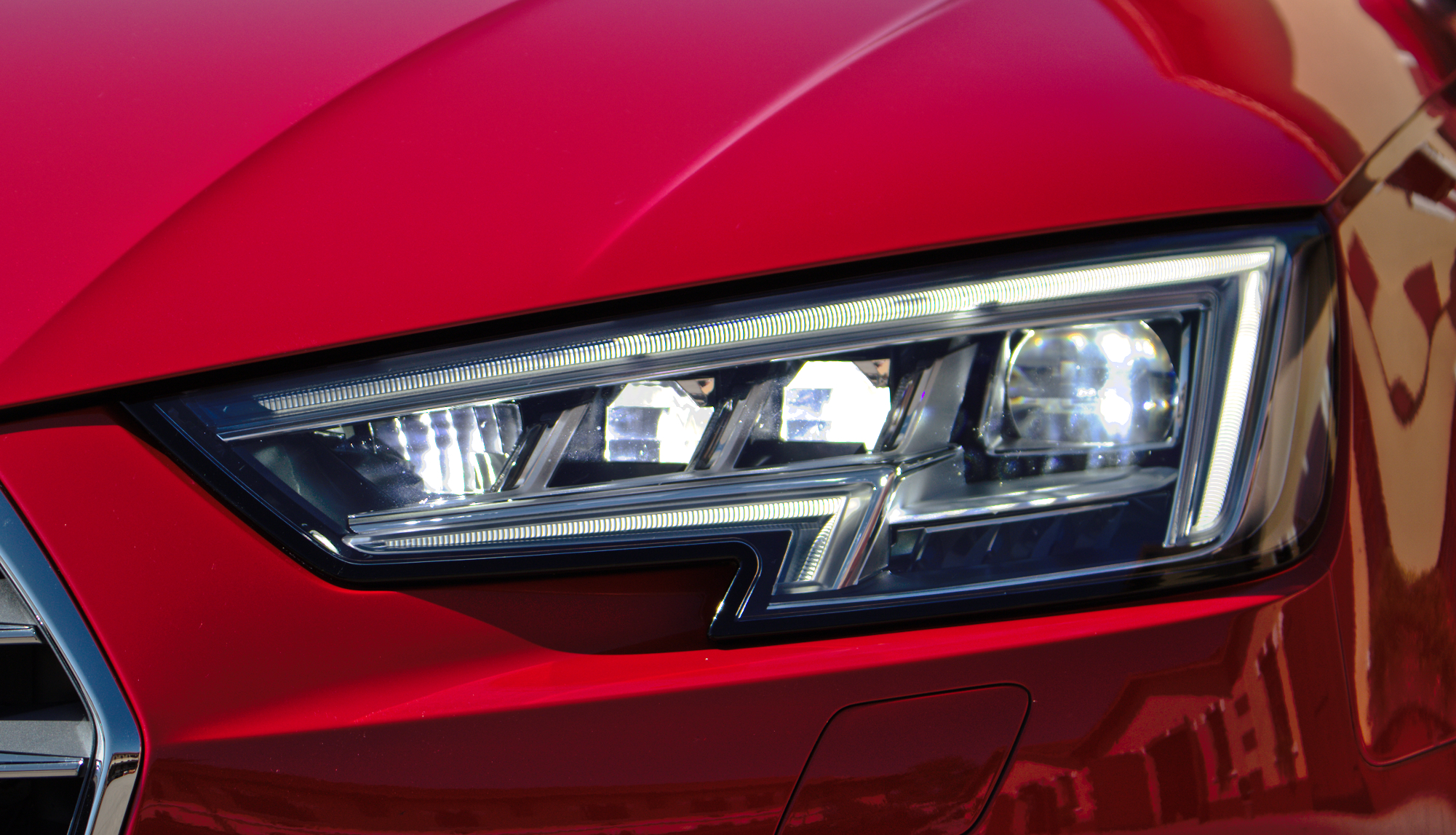
Digitally controlled adaptive non-glare multi-LED headlamp technology, on the Audi A4

==== Timeline ====
Audi showed the Audi Nuvolari concept car with LED headlights in 2003. Automotive headlamp applications using light-emitting diodes (LEDs) have been undergoing development since 2004. In 2004, Audi released the first car with LED daytime running lights and directionals, the 2004 Audi A8 W12.

In 2006 the first series-production LED low beams were factory-installed on the Lexus LS 600h / LS 600h L. The high beam and turn signal functions used filament bulbs. The headlamp was supplied by Koito Industries Ltd.

In 2007 the first headlamps with all functions provided by LEDs, supplied by AL-Automotive Lighting, were introduced on the V10 Audi R8 sports car (except in North America).

In 2009 Hella headlamps on the 2009 Cadillac Escalade Platinum became the first all-LED headlamps for the North American market.

In 2010 the first all-LED headlamps with adaptive high beam and what Mercedes called the "Intelligent Light System" were introduced on the 2011 Mercedes CLS.

In 2013 the first digitally controlled full-LED glare-free "Matrix LED" adaptive headlamps were introduced by Audi on the facelifted A8, with 25 individual LED segments. The system dims the light that would shine directly onto oncoming and preceding vehicles, but continues to cast its full light on the zones between and beside them. This works because the LED high beams are split into numerous individual light-emitting diodes. High-beam LEDs in both headlights are arranged in a matrix and adapt fully electronically to the surroundings in milliseconds. They are activated and deactivated or dimmed individually by a control unit. In addition, the headlights also function as a cornering light. Using predictive route data supplied by the MMI navigation plus, the focus of the beam is shifted towards the bend even before the driver turns the steering wheel. In 2014: Mercedes-Benz introduced a similar technology on the facelifted CLS-Class in 2014, called Multibeam LED, with 24 individual segments.

As of 2010, LED headlamps such as those available on the Toyota Prius were providing output between halogen and HID headlamps, with system power consumption slightly lower than other headlamps, longer lifespans, and more flexible design possibilities. As LED technology continues to evolve, the performance of LED headlamps was predicted to improve to approach, meet, and perhaps one day surpass that of HID headlamps. That occurred by mid-2013, when the Mercedes S-Class came with LED headlamps giving higher performance than comparable HID setups.

LED headlamps in recent vehicles have been widely criticized for being too bright and blinding other drivers. Federal Motor Vehicle Safety Standard 108 has not been updated since the introduction of LEDs, and some manufacturers have reportedly engineered headlamps to have a dark spot where they are measured according to the regulation while being over-illuminated in the rest of the field.

==== Cold lenses ====
Before LEDs, all light sources used in headlamps (tungsten, halogen, HID) emitted infrared energy that can thaw built-up snow and ice off a headlamp lens and prevent further accumulation; LEDs do not. Some LED headlamps move heat from the heat sink on the back of the LEDs to the inner face of the front lens to warm it up, while on others no provision is made for lens thawing.

=== Laser ===
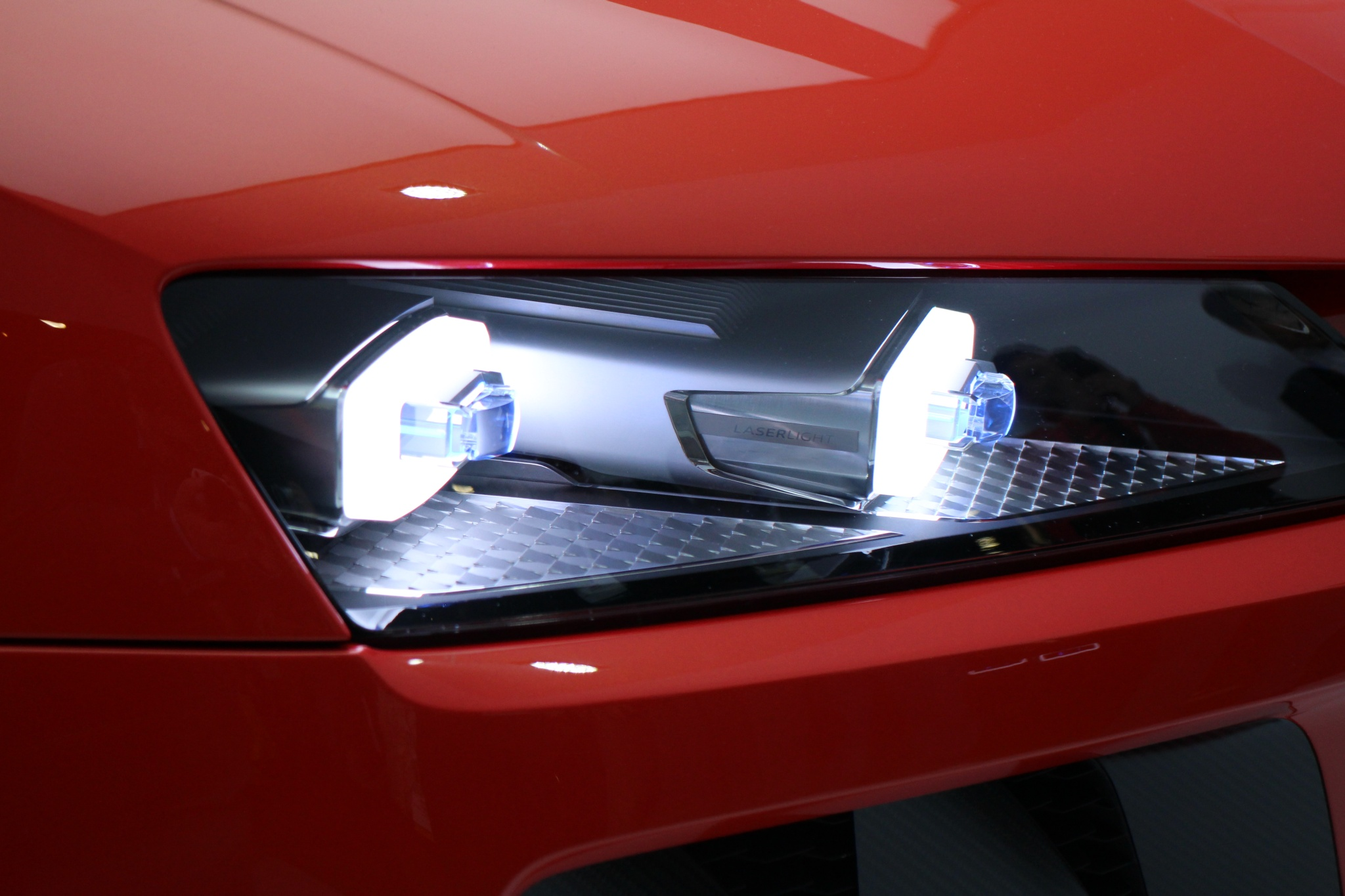
Audi Matrix Laser headlamp at Consumer Electronics Show 2014

A laser lamp uses mirrors to direct a laser on to a phosphor that then emits a light. Laser lamps use half as much power as LED lamps. They were first developed by Audi for use as headlamps in the 24 Hours of Le Mans in 2014.

In 2014, the BMW i8 became the first production car to be sold with an auxiliary high-beam lamp based on this technology. The limited-production Audi R8 LMX uses lasers for its spot lamp feature, providing illumination for high-speed driving in low-light conditions. The Rolls-Royce Phantom VIII employs laser headlights with a high beam range of over 600 meters.

== Automatic headlamps ==
Automatic systems for activating the headlamps have been available since the mid-1950s. In 1952, GM introduced the Autronic Eye, an automatic headlight dimming system, for Oldsmobile and Cadillac models. In 1964, the system was expanded upon, becoming the Twilight Sentinel, which used a photoelectric cell to detect changes in local light conditions. Some versions of the Twilight Sentinel system included a delay dial, which could be used by the driver to prevent unnecessary switching due to temporary light fluctuations, such as when driving under overpasses or through tunnels. Later high-end Ford Motor Company vehicles came with their own similar apparatus, called "AutoLamp".

Modern implementations use sensors to detect the amount of exterior light. UN Regulation No. 48 provides requirements for operation and testing of adaptive front-lighting systems (AFS) and adaptive main headlamps. With a daytime running lamp equipped and operated, the dipped beam headlamp should automatically turn on if the car is driving in less than 1,000 lux ambient conditions such as in a tunnel and in dark environments. While in such situations, a daytime running lamp would make glare more evident to the upcoming vehicle driver, which in turn would influence the upcoming vehicle driver's eyesight, such that, by automatically switching the daytime running lamp to the dipped-beam headlamp, the inherent safety defect could be solved and safety benefit ensured.

== Beam aim control ==
=== Headlamp leveling systems ===
Headlamp leveling

The 1948 Citroën 2CV was launched in France with a manual headlamp leveling system, controlled by the driver with a knob through a mechanical rod linkage. This allowed the driver to adjust the vertical aim of the headlamps to compensate for the passenger and cargo load in the vehicle. In 1954, Cibié introduced an automatic headlamp leveling system linked to the vehicle's suspension system to keep the headlamps correctly aimed regardless of vehicle load, without driver intervention. The first vehicle to be so equipped was the Panhard Dyna Z. Beginning in the 1970s, Germany and some other European countries began requiring remote-control headlamp leveling systems that permit the driver to lower the lamps' aim by means of a dashboard control lever or knob if the rear of the vehicle is weighted down with passengers or cargo, which would tend to raise the lamps' aim angle and create glare. Such systems typically use stepper motors at the headlamp and a rotary switch on the dash marked "0", "1", "2", "3" for different beam heights, "0" being the "normal" (and highest) position for when the car is lightly loaded.

Internationalized ECE Regulation 48, in force in most of the world outside North America, currently specifies a limited range within which the vertical aim of the headlamps must be maintained under various vehicle load conditions; if the vehicle isn't equipped with an adaptive suspension sufficient to keep the headlamps aimed correctly regardless of load, a headlamp leveling system is required. The regulation stipulates a more stringent version of this anti-glare measure if the vehicle has headlamps with low beam light source(s) that produce more than 2,000 lumens – xenon bulbs and certain high-power halogens, for example. Such vehicles must be equipped with headlamp self-leveling systems that sense the vehicle's degree of squat due to cargo load and road inclination, and automatically adjust the headlamps' vertical aim to keep the beam correctly oriented without any action required by the driver.

Leveling systems are not required by the North American regulations. A 2007 study, however, suggests automatic levelers on all headlamps, not just those with high-power light sources, would give drivers substantial safety benefits of better seeing and less glare.

=== Directional headlamps ===
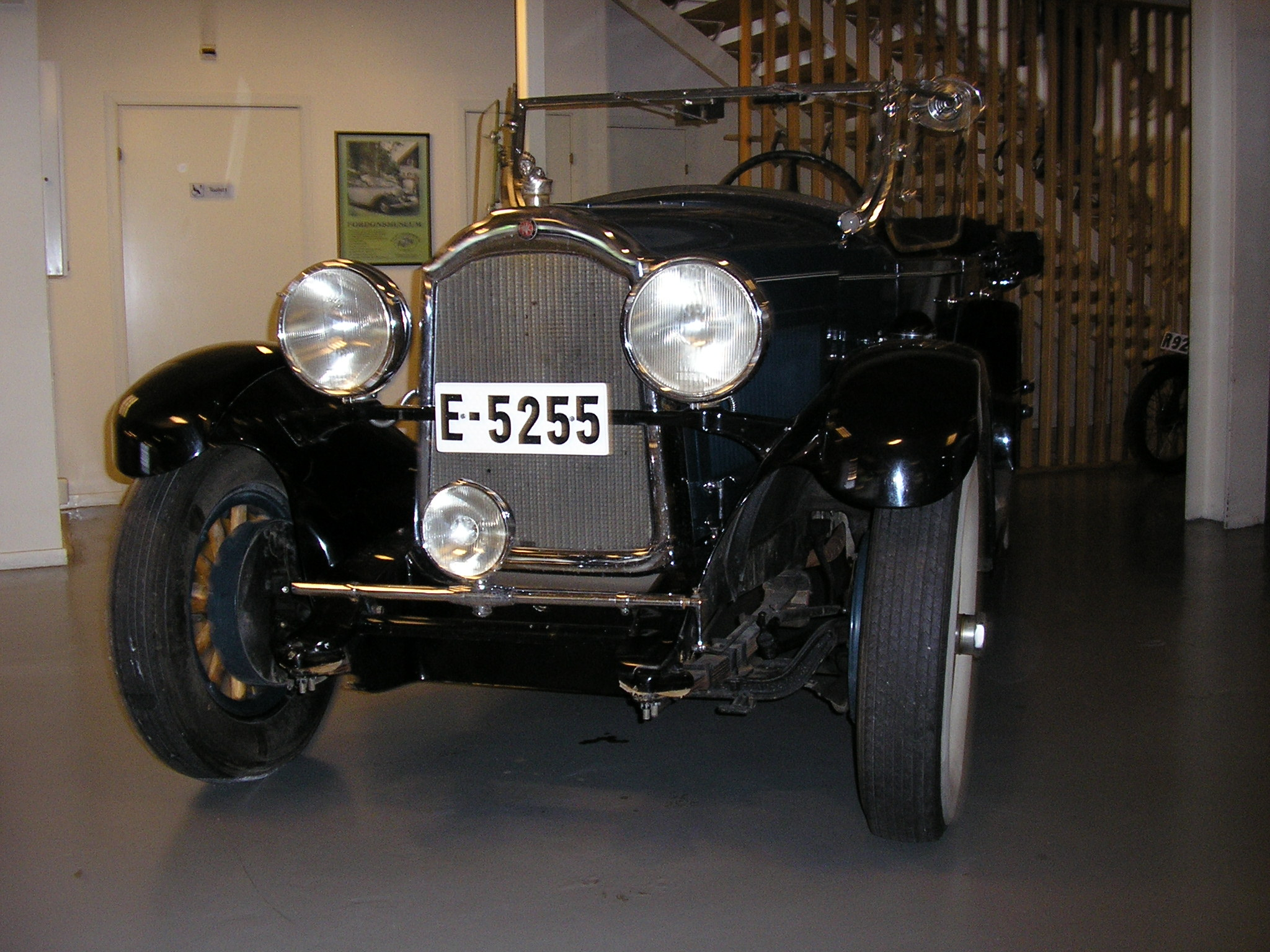
Directional (steering) headlamp (middle) on a 1928 Willys-Knight 70A Touring

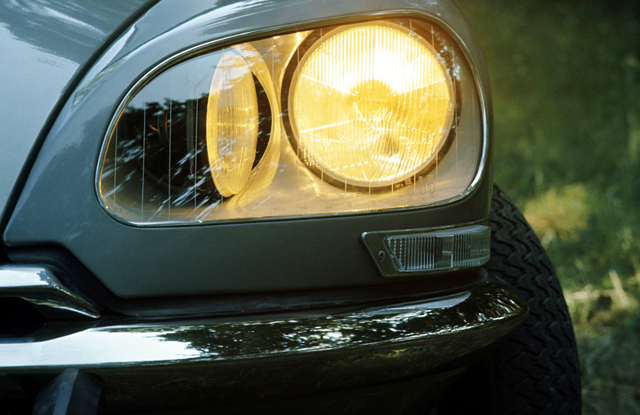
Directional (steering) headlamps on a Citroën DS – the driver can see clearly through curves.

These provide improved lighting for cornering. Some automobiles have their headlamps connected to the steering mechanism so the lights will follow the movement of the front wheels. Czechoslovak Tatra was an early implementer of such a technique, producing in the 1930s a vehicle with a central directional headlamp. The American 1948 Tucker Sedan was likewise equipped with a third central headlamp connected mechanically to the steering system.

The 1967 French Citroën DS and 1970 Citroën SM were equipped with an elaborate dynamic headlamp positioning system that adjusted the inboard headlamps' horizontal and vertical position in response to inputs from the vehicle's steering and suspension systems.

At that time US regulations required this system to be removed from those models sold in the U.S.

The D series cars equipped with the system used cables connecting the long-range headlamps to a lever on the steering relay while the inner long-range headlamps on the SM used a sealed hydraulic system using a glycerin-based fluid instead of mechanical cables. Both these systems were of the same design as their respective cars' headlamp leveling systems. The cables of the D system tended to rust in the cable sheaths while the SM system gradually leaked fluid, causing the long-range lamps to turn inward, looking "cross-eyed." A manual adjustment was provided but once it was to the end of its travel the system required refilling with fluid or replacement of the tubes and dashpots.

Citroën SM non-US market vehicles were equipped with heating of the headlamp cover glasses, this heat supplied by ducts carrying warm air from the radiator exhaust to the space between the headlamp lenses and the cover glasses. This provided demisting/defogging of the entire interior of the cover glasses, keeping the glass clear of mist/fog over the entire surface. The glasses have thin stripes on their surfaces that are heated by the headlight beams; however, the ducted warm air provides demisting when the headlamps are not turned on. The glasses' stripes on both D and SM cars appear similar to rear windshield glass electric defogger heating strips, but they are passive, not electrified.

=== Adaptive front-lighting system (AFS) ===
Advanced front-lighting system on Opel Vectra C

Beginning in the 2000s, there was a resurgence in interest in the idea of moving or optimizing the headlight beam in response not only to vehicular steering and suspension dynamics, but also to ambient weather and visibility conditions, vehicle speed, and road curvature and contour. A task force under the EUREKA organization, composed primarily of European automakers, lighting companies and regulators began working to develop design and performance specifications for what is known as Adaptive Front-Lighting Systems, commonly AFS. Manufacturers such as BMW, Toyota, Škoda, and Vauxhall/Opel have released vehicles equipped with AFS since 2003.

Rather than the mechanical linkages employed in earlier directional-headlamp systems, AFS relies on electronic sensors, transducers, and actuators. Other AFS techniques include special auxiliary optical systems within a vehicle's headlamp housings. These auxiliary systems may be switched on and off as the vehicle and operating conditions call for light or darkness at the angles covered by the beam the auxiliary optics produce. A typical system measures steering angle and vehicle speed to swivel the headlamps. The most advanced AFS systems use GPS signals to anticipate changes in road curvature, rather than simply reacting to them.

=== Automatic beam switching ===
Even when conditions would warrant the use of high-beam headlamps, drivers often do not use them. There have long been efforts, particularly in America, to devise an effective automatic beam selection system to relieve the driver of the need to select and activate the correct beam as traffic, weather, and road conditions change. General Motors introduced the first automatic headlight dimmer called the "Autronic Eye" in 1952 on their Cadillac, Buick, and Oldsmobile models; the feature was offered in other GM vehicles starting in 1953. The system's phototube and associated circuitry were housed in a gunsight-like tube atop the dashboard. An amplifier module was located in the engine compartment that controlled the headlight relay using signals from the dashboard-mounted tube unit.

This pioneering setup gave way in 1958 to a system called "GuideMatic" in reference to GM's Guide lighting division. The GuideMatic had a more compact dashtop housing and a control knob that allowed the driver to adjust the system's sensitivity threshold to determine when the headlamps would be dipped from high to low beam in response to an oncoming vehicle. By the early 1970s, this option was withdrawn from all GM models except Cadillac, on which GuideMatic was available through 1988. The photosensor for this system used an amber lens, and the adoption of retro-reflective yellow road signs, such as for oncoming curves, caused them to dim prematurely - possibly leading to their discontinuation.

Ford- and Chrysler-built vehicles were also available with the GM-made dimmers from the 1950s through the 1980s. A system called "AutoDim" was offered on several Lincoln models starting in the mid-1950s, and eventually the Ford Thunderbird and some Mercury models offered it as well. Premium Chrysler and Imperial models offered a system called Automatic Beam Control throughout the 1960s and early 1970s.

==== Rabinow dimmer ====
Though the systems based on photoresistors evolved, growing more compact and moving from the dashboard to a less conspicuous location behind the radiator grill, they were still unable to reliably distinguish headlamps from non-vehicular light sources such as streetlights. They also did not dip to low beam when the driver approached a vehicle from behind, and they would spuriously dip to low beam in response to road sign reflections of the vehicle's own high beam headlamps. American inventor Jacob Rabinow devised and refined a scanning automatic dimmer system impervious to streetlights and reflections, but no automaker purchased the rights, and the problematic photoresistor type remained on the market through the late 1980s.

==== Bone-Midland lamps ====
In 1956, the inventor Even P. Bone developed a system where a vane in front of each headlight moved automatically and caused a shadow in front of the approaching vehicle, allowing for high beam use without glare for the approaching driver. The system, called "Bone-Midland Lamps," was never taken up by any car manufacturer.

==== Camera-based dimmer ====
Present systems based on imaging CMOS cameras can detect and respond appropriately to leading and oncoming vehicles while disregarding streetlights, road signs, and other spurious signals. Camera-based beam selection was first released in 2005 on the Jeep Grand Cherokee and has since then been incorporated into comprehensive driver assistance systems by automakers worldwide. The headlights will dim when a bright reflection bounces off of a street sign.

=== Intelligent Light System ===
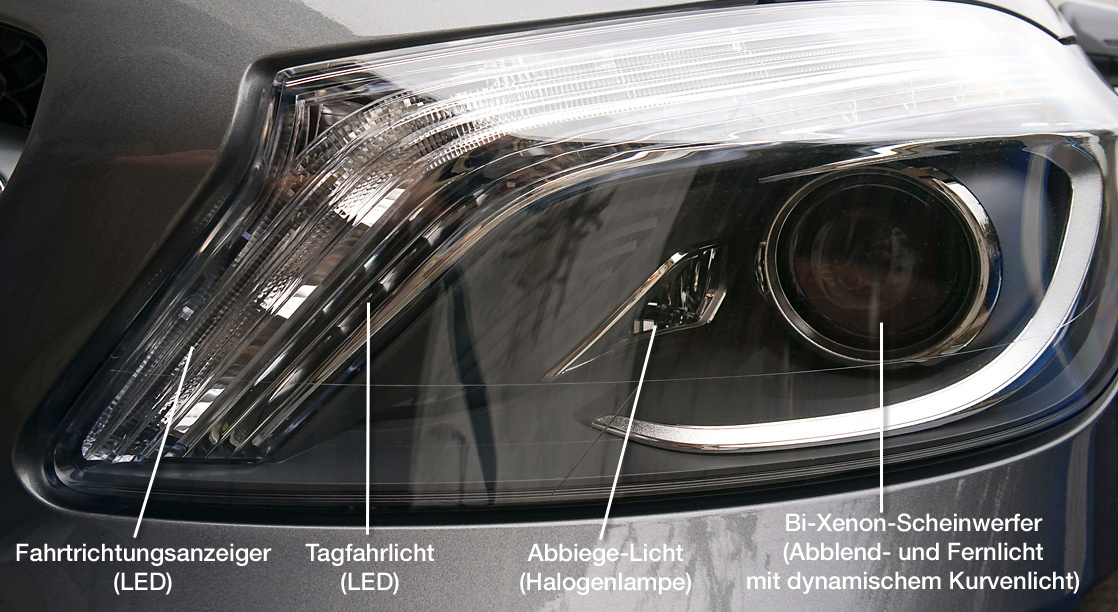
Intelligent Light System on A-Class

Intelligent Light System is a headlamp beam control system introduced in 2006 on the Mercedes-Benz E-Class (W211) which offers five different bi-xenon light functions, each of which is suited to typical driving or weather conditions:

- Country mode
- Motorway mode
- Enhanced fog lamps
- Active light function (Advanced front-lighting system (AFS))
- Cornering light function

=== Adaptive highbeam ===
Adaptive Highbeam Assist is Mercedes-Benz's marketing name for a headlight control strategy that continuously automatically tailors the headlamp range so the beam just reaches other vehicles ahead, thus always ensuring maximum possible seeing range without glaring other road users. It was first launched in the Mercedes E-class in 2009. It provides a continuous range of beam reach from a low-aimed low beam to a high-aimed high beam, rather than the traditional binary choice between low and high beams.

The range of the beam can vary between 65 and 300 meters, depending on traffic conditions. In traffic, the low beam cutoff position is adjusted vertically to maximise seeing range while keeping glare out of leading and oncoming drivers' eyes. When no traffic is close enough for glare to be a problem, the system provides full high beam. Headlamps are adjusted every 40 milliseconds by a camera on the inside of the front windscreen which can determine distance to other vehicles. The S-Class, CLS-Class and C-Class also offer this technology. In the CLS, the adaptive high beam is realised with LED headlamps - the first vehicle producing all adaptive light functions with LEDs.

This technology is also known as Adaptive Driving Beams (ADB). Since 2010 some Audi models with Xenon headlamps are offering a similar system: adaptive light with variable headlight range control. In Japan, the Toyota Crown, Toyota Crown Majesta, Nissan Fuga and Nissan Cima offer the technology on top level models.

Until February 2022, this technology had been illegal in the US, as FMVSS 108 specifically stated that headlamps must have dedicated high and low beams to be deemed road-legal. An infrastructure bill enacted in November 2021 included language that directs the National Highway Traffic Safety Administration to amend FMVSS 108 to allow the use of this technology, and set a two-year deadline for implementing this change. In February 2022, the NHTSA amended FMVSS 108 allowing adaptive headlights for use in the US. However, the new regulations are quite different from the ones in effect in Europe and Asia and prevent car manufacturers from easily adapting their systems to the US market.

=== Glare-free high beam and pixel light ===
A glare-free high beam is a camera-driven dynamic lighting control strategy that selectively shades spots and slices out of the high beam pattern to protect other road users from glare, while continuously providing the driver with maximum seeing range. The area surrounding other road users is constantly illuminated at high beam intensity, but without the glare that would typically result from using uncontrolled high beams in traffic. This constantly changing beam pattern requires complex sensors, microprocessors, and actuators because the vehicles which must be shadowed out of the beam are constantly moving. The dynamic shadowing can be achieved with movable shadow masks shifted within the light path inside the headlamp. Or, the effect can be achieved by selectively darkening addressable LED emitters or reflector/mirror elements, a technique known as pixel light.

The first mechanically controlled (non-LED), glare-free high beam was Volkswagen's "Dynamic Light Assist" package, which was introduced in 2010 on the Volkswagen Touareg, Phaeton, and Passat. In 2012, the facelifted Lexus LS (XF40) introduced an identical bi-xenon system: "Adaptive High-beam System".

The first mechanically controlled LED glare-free headlamps were introduced in 2012 on BMW 7 Series: "Selective Beam" (anti-dazzle high-beam assistant). In 2013 Mercedes-Benz introduced the same LED system: "Adaptive Highbeam Assist Plus".

The first digitally controlled LED glare-free headlamps were introduced in 2013 on Audi A8. See LED section.

== Care ==
Headlamp systems require periodic maintenance. Sealed beam headlamps are modular; when the filament burns out, the entire sealed beam is replaced. Most vehicles in North America made since the late 1980s use headlamp lens-reflector assemblies that are considered a part of the car, and just the bulb is replaced when it fails. Manufacturers vary the means by which the bulb is accessed and replaced. Headlamp aim must be properly checked and adjusted frequently, for misaimed lamps are dangerous and ineffective.

Over time, the headlamp lens can deteriorate. It can become pitted due to abrasion of road sand and pebbles and can crack, admitting water into the headlamp. "Plastic" (polycarbonate) lenses can become cloudy and discoloured. This is due to oxidation of the painted-on lens hardcoat by ultraviolet light from the sun and the headlamp bulbs. If it is minor, it can be polished out using a reputable brand of a car polish that is intended for restoring the shine to chalked paint. In more advanced stages, the deterioration extends through the actual plastic material, rendering the headlamp useless and necessitating complete replacement. Sanding or aggressively polishing the lenses, or plastic headlight restoration, can buy some time, but doing so removes the protective coating from the lens, which when so stripped will deteriorate faster and more severely. Kits for a quality repair are available that allow the lens to be polished with progressively finer abrasives, and then be sprayed with an aerosol of ultra violet resistant clear coating.

The reflector, made out of vaporized aluminum deposited in an extremely thin layer on a metal, glass, or plastic substrate, can become dirty, oxidised, or burnt, and lose its specularity. This can happen if water enters the headlamp, if bulbs of higher than specified wattage are installed, or simply with age and use. Reflectors thus degraded, if they cannot be cleaned, must be replaced.

== Lens cleaners ==
Headlamp washers in action on a Skoda Yeti

Dirt buildup on headlamp lenses increases glare to other road users, even at levels too low to reduce seeing performance significantly for the driver. Therefore, headlamp lens cleaners are required by UN Regulation 48 on vehicles equipped with low-beam headlamps using light sources that have a reference luminous flux of 2,000 lumens or more. This includes all HID headlamps and some high-power halogen units. Some cars have lens cleaners fitted even where the regulations do not require them. North America, for example, does not use UN regulations, and FMVSS 108 does not require lens cleaners on any headlamps, though they are permitted.

Lens cleaning systems come in two main varieties: a small motor-driven rubber wiper or brush conceptually similar to windshield wipers, or a fixed or telescopic high-pressure sprayer which cleans the lenses with a spray of windshield washer fluid. Most recent lens cleaning systems are of the spray type because UN regulations do not permit mechanical cleaning systems (wipers) to be used with plastic-lens headlamps, and most recent headlamps have plastic lenses. Some cars with retractable headlamps, such as the original Mazda MX-5, have a squeegee at the front of the lamp recess which automatically wipes the lenses as they are raised or lowered, although it does not provide washer fluid.

== Covers ==
Headlamp covers are aftermarket modifications made from a variety of materials (e.g., metal, polycarbonate, ABS plastic or self-adhesive vinyl film) which are applied over the headlamps of a car in order to reduce the percentage of light transmitted, to tint the color of the light transmitted, and/or to protect the lenses from stone chips, bug splatters, and minor abrasions.

During World War II, civil and military authorities often enforced brownouts and blackouts, restricting the use of lights on passenger vehicles in order to hinder detection by aerial reconnaissance and bombers. Blackouts (turning off lights) and brownouts (limiting light emissions by way of hoods and masks) were enforced in cities and coastal areas as protection against the night-time aerial attacks in both Axis and Allied countries. One of the first civilian examples of headlight covers was produced in NSW, Australia by the Read family dairy.

The use of headlight covers and the modification of light produced by vehicles continued in both the military's development of special blackout head and tail light technologies and in the civilian sector as well. In addition to headlight covers' use in light reduction, they have also been employed to protect headlamps from damage in both civilian and combat environments.

=== Legality ===
There is no statute which governs the use of headlight covers throughout the United States. Most localities and municipalities will have laws which regulate the use of headlight covers and or tint and will specify the percentage of light that must pass through and/or the minimum distance from which a vehicle's headlights must be visible.

== See also ==
- Automotive lamp types
- Automotive lighting
- Automotive night vision
- Headlamp tester
- Headlamp (outdoor)
- Headlight flashing
- ISIRI 6672
- Lighting-up time
- Train lights
- Twilight Sentinel
- World Forum for Harmonization of Vehicle Regulations
