= H1 lamp =

Automotive light bulb

H1 Lamp
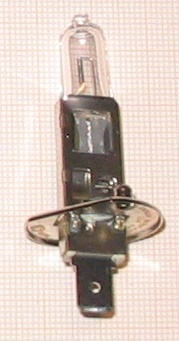
- H1 lamp

General Information
- Category: Automotive
- Type: Halogen
- Filament orientation: Axial
- Filament count: One

The H1 is a halogen lamp designed for use in automotive headlamps and fog and driving lamps. It has also been widely applied in emergency vehicle lights.

== Origin ==
The H1 was the first halogen lamp approved for automotive use. It was introduced in 1962 by a group of European bulb and headlamp manufacturers. The bulb was not approved for use in the US until 1997.

== Specifications ==
=== Base ===
The H1 lamp uses a P14.5s base in accord with IEC 60061. This is a round metal prefocus base 14.5 mm in diameter with a flat and two dimples so the H1 can be installed in a lamp only in the one correct orientation. There is one 6.35 mm male spade terminal in the center of the base, through which power is supplied. The H1 grounds through the metal base itself.

=== Power and output ===
Under ECE Regulation 37, which governs automotive filament lamps in most of the world, the H1 lamp's nominal rating is 55 W at 12 V, and its test rating is 68 W (maximum) and 1550 ± 15% lumens at 13.2 V. R37 also contains provisions for 6 V, 55 W and 24 V, 70 W H1 lamps. The United States government does not recognise ECE regulations, but rather applies its own regulations. Under these, the H1 is rated 65 W (maximum) and 1410 lumens ± 15% at 12.8 V. Despite the two different sets of specified voltages and test protocols, the lamps themselves are the same; with few exceptions, 12 V H1 lamps are generally manufactured and tested to comply with both regulations.

=== Colour of light ===
Under ECE regulations, H1 lamps are required to emit white or selective yellow light. U.S. regulations require H1 lamps to emit white light. Under both ECE and U.S. specifications, the allowable range of white light is quite large; some H1 lamps have a slight blue or yellow tint to the glass yet still produce light legally acceptable under the requirement for white light.

== Variants ==
=== Compliant ===
Because the light output is specified as a nominal value with a 30 % tolerance (± 15%), H1 lamps may be optimised for longer life (with lower flux and luminance), or for higher flux and luminance (with shorter life). A long-life filament is wound on a larger mandrel with a wider pitch — the separation distance between adjacent filament coils. This tends to reduce the filament's luminance and the focus of the beam from the headlamp, Opposite alterations are made to create higher-performance lamps; the filament is wound on a smaller mandrel with a tighter pitch. This increases flux and luminance and creates a better-focused beam from the headlamp, but lifespan is reduced. These same changes can be made with different parameters to give output identical to a standard bulb, but with lower power consumption.

=== Noncompliant ===
Lamps are available that conform to the physical specifications for H1, but not to the regulated specifications for power consumption, light output, and/or light colour. These include high-wattage lamps, and those that emit light of a colour outside the white or selective yellow specification ranges. Such lamps are illegal throughout the industrialised world for use in regulated automotive lighting devices, and so vehicle wiring, switches, and lighting components are generally not designed or built to withstand the higher heat and power consumption from off-spec lamps. Lamps with higher-than-specified output can also create unsafe levels of glare. There is considerable variability by jurisdiction in the regulation of off-road applications of lamp types used in on-road vehicles.

== See also ==
- List of automotive light bulb types
