= List of automotive light bulb types =

Bulb Types and Descriptions

Light bulbs for automobiles are made in several standardized series. Bulbs used for headlamps, turn signals and brake lamps may be required to comply with international and national regulations governing the types of lamps used. Other automotive lighting applications such as auxiliary lamps or interior lighting may not be regulated, but common types are used by many automotive manufacturers.

== International ==
The World Forum for Harmonization of Vehicle Regulations (ECE Regulations) develops and maintains international-consensus UN Regulations on light sources acceptable for use in lamps on vehicles and trailers type-approved for use in countries that recognise the UN Regulations. These include Regulation 37, which contains specifications for filament lamps, and Regulation 99 and its addenda which covers light sources for high-intensity discharge headlamps. Some UN-approved bulb types are also permitted by some other regulations, such as those of the United States or of Japan, though Japan has begun supplanting the former Japanese national regulations with the international UN regulations.

=== Filament lamps ===
UN Regulation 37 covers motor vehicle filament lamps. These are categorized in three groups: those without general restriction that can be used in any application, those acceptable only for signalling lights (not for road illumination lamps), and those no longer allowable as light sources for new type approvals but still permitted for production as replacement parts.

==== Group 1 ====
Group 1 (Without general restrictions)
Category	Filaments	Nominal power (major/minor filament where applicable)	Cap (base) per IEC 60061	Other approvals	Remarks	Image
H1	1	6 V & 12 V: 55 W 24 V: 70 W	P14.5s	USA, Japan	12V: ECE nominal luminous flux: 1,550 lm ±15%	
H3	1	6 V & 12 V: 55 W 24 V: 70 W	PK22s	USA, Japan	12V: ECE nominal luminous flux: 1,450 lm ±15%	
H4	2	6 V & 12 V: 60 / 55 W 24 V: 75 / 70 W	P43t	Japan	Similar US bulb: HB2 (9003) 12V: ECE nominal luminous flux: 1,650 / 1,000 lm ±15% Available with P45t base to upgrade old headlamps designed for R2 bulb	
H7	1	12 V: 55 W 24 V: 70 W	PX26d	USA, Japan	12V: ECE nominal luminous flux: 1,500 lm ±10%	
H8	1	12 V: 35 W	PGJ19-1	USA	ECE nominal luminous flux: 800 lm ±15%	
H8B	1	12 V: 35 W	PGJY19-1	USA		
H9	1	12 V: 65 W	PGJ19-5	USA		
H9B	1	12 V: 65 W	PGJY19-5	USA		
H10	1	12 V: 42 W	PY20d	USA	ANSI № 9145; ECE nominal luminous flux: 850 lm ±15%	
H11	1	12 V: 55 W 24 V: 70 W	PGJ19-2	USA	ECE nominal luminous flux: 1,350 lm ±10%	
H11B	1	12 V: 55 W 24 V: 70 W	PGJY19-2	USA		
H12	1	12 V: 53 W	PZ20d	USA	ANSI № 9055; ECE nominal luminous flux: 1,050 lm ±15%	
H13	2	12 V: 60 / 55 W	P26.4t	USA	ANSI № 9008; ECE nominal luminous flux: 1,700 / 1,100 lm ±15%	
H13A	2	12 V: 60 / 55 W	PJ26.4t	USA		
H15	2	12 V: 55 / 15 W 24 V: 60 / 20 W	PGJ23t-1	USA	ECE nominal luminous flux: 26/1350 ±10% Low-wattage filament for DRL function	
H16	1	12 V: 19 W	PGJ19-3			
H16B	1	12 V: 19 W	PGJY19-3			
H21W	1	12 V & 24 V: 21 W	BAY9s			
H27W/1	1	12 V: 27W	PG13	USA	ANSI № 880	
H27W/2	1	12 V: 27 W	PGJ13	USA	ANSI № 881	
HB3	1	12 V: 60 W	P20d 90°	USA, Japan	ANSI № 9005; ECE nominal luminous flux: 1700 lm ±15%	
HB3A	1	12 V: 60 W	P20d 180°	USA	ANSI № 9005XS	
HB4	1	12 V: 51 W	P22d 90°	USA, Japan	ECE nominal luminous flux:1000 ± 15% ANSI № 9006	HB4 (9006) bulb 12 V, 51 W
HB4A	1	12 V: 51 W	P22d 180°	USA	ANSI № 9006XS	
HIR1	1	12 V: 60 W	PX20d	USA, Japan	ANSI № 9011	
HIR2	1	12 V: 55 W	PX22d	USA, Japan	ANSI № 9012	
HP24W	1	12 V: 24 W			Exclusively produced by Valeo	
HPY24W	1	12 V: 24 W			Amber, Exclusively produced by Valeo	
HS1	2	6 V & 12 V: 35 / 35 W	PX43t		For motorcycles	
HS2	1	6 V & 12 V: 15 W	PX13.5s		For motorcycles	
HS5	2	12 V: 35 / 30 W	P23t		For motorcycles	
HS5A	2	12 V: 45 / 40 W	PX23t		For motorcycles	
HS6	2	12 V: 40 / 35 W	PX26.4t		For motorcycles	
PX24W	1	12 V: 24 W	PGU20-7			
PSX24W	1	12 V: 24 W	PG20-7		ANSI № 2504	
PSX26W	1	12 V: 26 W	PG18.5d-3		ANSI № 6851	
S1	2	6 V & 12 V: 45 / 40 W	BA20d		For car headlights	
S2	2	6 V & 12 V: 35 / 35 W	BA20d		For motorcycles	S2 bulb
S3	2	6 V & 12 V: 15 W	P26s		For mopeds	

==== Group 2 ====
Group 2 (Only for use in signalling lamps, cornering lamps, reversing lamps and rear registration plate lamps)
Category	Cap (Base)	Filaments	Nominal Power (Major/Minor where applicable)	Comments	Image
Festoon (Note: This term is also used for (unrelated) strings of high voltage outdoor lamps.)	SV7.8 / T8 or C5W (8mm x 28mm) (bulb dia x length)	1	12V 3W; 12V 10W; 24V 3W	Lengths quoted are tip to tip, nominally. Four are commonly cited by manufacturers: 31, 36, 39 and 41 mm. Wattages are for filament lamps, not LEDs	
Festoon	T10 (10mm x 31mm)	1	12 V 10 W; 6V 10W		
Festoon	SV8-5.8 / T11 (11mm x 36mm)	1	12V 5W; 12V 10W; 24V 5W; 24V 10W		
Festoon	SV8-5.8 / T11 (11mm x 41mm)	1	12V 5W; 12V 10W; 24V 5W; 24V 10W		
Festoon	(14mm x 36mm)	1	12 V, 10 W	Not in Narva catalogue	
Festoon	SV8-5.8 / T15 (15mm x 41mm)	1	12V 10W; 12V 18W; 12V 21W; 24V 18W		
Festoon	SV8-5.8 / T15 (15mm x 44mm)	1	12V 18W (C18W); 12V 21W (C21W); 24V 21W		
H6W	BAX9s	1	12 V: 6 W		
HY6W	BAZ9s	1	12 V: 6 W	Amber	
H10W/1	BAU9s	1	12 V: 10 W		
HY10W	BAUZ9s	1	12 V: 10 W	Amber	
H21W	BAY9s	1	12 V & 24 V: 21 W		
HY21W	BAW9s	1	12 V & 24 V: 21 W	Amber	
P13W	PG18.5d-1	1	12 V: 13 W	ANSI № 828|	
PW13W	WP3.3×14.5-7	1	12 V: 13 W		
PC16W	PU20d-1	1	12 V: 16 W	ANSI № 7010	
PCR16W	PU20d-7	1	12 V: 16 W	Red	
PW16W	WP3.3×14.5-8	1	12 V: 16 W	ANSI № 7445	
PWR16W	WP3.3×14.5-10	1	12 V: 16 W	Red	
PWY16W	WP3.3×14.5-9	1	12 V: 16 W	Amber, ANSI № 7448	
PS19W	PG20-1	1	12 V: 19 W	ANSI № 5201	
PSY19W	PG20-2	1	12 V: 19 W	Amber, ANSI № 2502	
PW19W	WP3.3×14.5-1	1	12 V: 19 W	ANSI № 7446	
PWR19W	WP3.3×14.5-5	1	12 V: 19 W	Red	
PWY19W	WP3.3×14.5-2	1	12 V: 19 W	Amber, ANSI № 7449	
P21W	BA15s	1	6 V, 12 V, 24 V: 21 W	ECE nominal luminous flux: 460lm ± 15% Old designation: P25-1	
PR21W	BAW15s	1	12 V & 24 V: 21 W	Red	
PY21W	BAU15s	1	12 V & 24 V: 21 W	Amber ECE nominal luminous flux: 280 lm ±20%	
P21/4W	BAZ15d	2	12 V & 24 V: 21 / 4 W		
PR21/4W	BAU15d	2	12 V & 24 V: 21 / 4 W	Red	
P21/5W	BAY15d	2	6 V, 12 V, 24 V: 21 / 5 W	ECE nominal luminous flux: 440/45 lm ±15%/20%. Old designation: P25-2	
PR21/5W	BAW15d	2	12 V & 24 V: 21 / 5 W	Red	
P24W	PGU20-3	1	12 V: 24 W		
PY24W	PGU20-4	1	12 V: 24 W	ANSI № 5200	
PH24WY		1	12 V: 24 W	Amber	
PS24W	PG20-3	1	12 V: 24 W	ANSI № 5202	
PSX24W	PG20-4?	1	12 V: 24 W	ANSI № 2504; Similar to PS24W, but with slightly different luminous flux tolerance	
PSY24W	PG20-4	1	12 V: 24 W	Amber, ANSI № 2503	
PW24W	WP3.3×14.5-3	1	12 V: 24 W	ANSI № 7447	
PWR24W	WP3.3×14.5-6	1	12 V: 24 W	Red	
PWY24W	WP3.3×14.5-4	1	12 V: 24 W	Amber, ANSI № 7450	
P27W	W2.5×16d	1	12 V: 27 W	ANSI № 3156	
P27/7W	W2.5×16q	2	12 V: 27 / 7 W	ANSI № 3157	
PR27/7W	WU2.5x16	2	12 V: 27 / 7 W	Red	
PY27/7W	WX2.5x16q	2	12 V: 27 / 7 W	Amber; ANSI № 3757A	
R5W	BA15s	1	6 V, 12 V, 24 V: 5 W	Old designation: R19/5	
RR5W	BAW15s	1	12 V & 24 V: 5 W	Red	
R10W	BA15s	1	6 V, 12 V, 24 V: 10 W	Old designation: R19/10	
RR10W	BAW15s	1	12 V & 24 V: 10 W	Red	
RY10W	BAU15s	1	6 V, 12 V, 24 V: 10 W	Amber	
T1.4W	P11.5d	1	12 V: 1.4W		
T4	5.6 mm bayonet, used in instrument clusters	1	12 V: 1W	various lengths as T4.2, T4.7; T3 is even smaller (base hole is 4 mm)	
T4W	BA9s	1	6 V, 12 V, 24 V: 4W	Old designation: T8/4	
W2.3W	W2×4.6d	1	12 V: 2.3 W	T5 size	
WY2.3W	W2×4.6d	1	12 V: 2.3 W	Amber	
W3W	W2.1×9.5d	1	6 V, 12 V, 24 V: 3 W	T10 size Old designation: W10/3	
W5W	W2.1×9.5d	1	6 V, 12 V, 24 V: 5 W	ECE nominal luminous flux: 50 lm ±20% T10 size Old designation: W10/5 ANSI № 168	
WR5W	W2.1×9.5d	1	12 V & 24 V: 5 W	Red	
WY5W	W2.1×9.5d	1	6 V, 12 V, 24 V: 5 W	Amber ECE nominal luminous flux: 30 lm ±20%	
W10W	W2.1×9.5d	1	6 V & 12 V: 10 W	T13 size	
WY10W	W2.1×9.5d	1	6 V & 12 V: 10 W		
W15/5W	WZ3×16q	2	12 V: 15 / 5 W	for motorcycles	
W16W	W2.1×9.5d	1	12 V: 16 W	T15 size ANSI № 921	
WY16W	W2.1×9.5d	1	12 V: 16 W	Amber, ANSI № 921NA	
W21W	W3×16d	1	12 V: 21 W	T20 size ANSI № 7440	
WY21W	WX3×16d	1	12 V: 21 W	Amber; ANSI № 7440NA	
WP21W	WY2.5×16d	1	12 V: 21 W		
WPY21W	WZ2.5×16d	1	12 V: 21 W	Amber	
W21/5W	W3×16q	2	12 V: 21 / 5 W	T20 size ANSI № 7443	
WR21/5W	WY3×16q	2	12 V: 21 / 5 W	Red	

==== Group 3 ====
Group 3 (For replacement purposes only)
Category	Cap (Base)	Filaments	Nominal power	Comments	Image
C21W	SV8.5	1	12 V: 21 W	Old designation: C15, for reversing lamp only	
H2	X511	1	12 V / 55 W	ECE nominal luminous flux: 1800lm ±15% Deleted from Reg 37	
H14	2	12 V: 60 / 55 W	P38t	Japan; ECE nominal luminous flux: 1,750 / 1,150 lm ±15%	
P19W	PGU20-1	1	12 V: 19 W		
PC16W	PU20d-1	1	12 V: 16 W		
PCR16W	PU20d-7	1	12 V: 16 W	Red	
PCY16W	PU20d-2	1	12 V: 16 W	Amber	
PR19W	PGU20-5	1	12 V: 19 W	Red	
PY19W	PGU20-2	1	12 V: 19 W	Amber	
PSR19W	PG20-5	1	12 V: 19 W	Red	
PSR24W	PG20-6	1	12 V: 24 W	Red	
PR24W	PGU20-6	1	12 V: 24 W	Red	
R2	P45t	2	6 V & 12 V: 45 / 40 W 24 V: 55 / 50 W	Standard and higher-wattage versions available with halogen burner	
S1	BA20d	2	6 V & 12 V: 25 / 25 W	for motorcycles	

=== Gas discharge lamps ===
UN Regulation 99 covers gas discharge light sources for use in vehicle headlamps. All light sources acceptable under Regulation 99 are also acceptable under US regulations.

Category	Cap (Base)	Nominal power	Remarks	Image
D1R	PK32d-3	85 V / 35 W	Integral ignitor For reflector systems	
D1S	PK32d-2	85 V / 35 W	Integral ignitor For projector systems	
D2R	P32d-3	85 V / 35 W	For reflector systems	
D2S	P32d-2	85 V / 35 W	For projector systems	
D3R	PK32d-6	42 V / 35 W	Mercury-free; Integral ignitor For reflector systems	
D3S	PK32d-5	42 V / 35 W	Mercury-free; Integral ignitor For projector systems	
D4R	P32d-6	42 V / 35 W	Mercury-free; For reflector systems	
D4S	P32d-5	42 V / 35 W	Mercury-free; For projector systems	
D5S	PK32d-[7]	12 V: 25 W	Ballast output voltage	
D6S	P32d-1	42 V: 25 W		
D7S	PK32d-1	42 V: 25 W		
D8S	PK32d-1	42 V: 25 W		

== Germany ==
There is a German national regulation for vehicle bulbs, now superseded by international ECE regulations. Bulbs according to the old German regulation are still manufactured. The German regulation is contained in §22a, Subsection 1, No. 18 of the Straßenverkehrs-Zulassungs-Ordnung (StVZO, Road Traffic Approval Regulation). Per the Fahrzeugteileverordnung (FzTV, Vehicle Parts Regulation), such light bulbs must bear an approval mark consisting of a sine wave and the letter 'K'. The technical requirements themselves are established by standards produced by DIN.

German vehicle bulbs per DIN
Category	Nominal power	Filaments	Cap (Base)	Comments	Image
Form K (DIN 72601, Part 4)	6 V, 10 W	1	SV8.5-8	11 × 41 mm	
Form K (DIN 72601, Part 4)	12 V, 10 W	1	SV8.5-8	11 × 41 mm	
Form K (DIN 72601, Part 6)	6 V, 18 W	1	SV8.5-8	15 × 41 mm	
Form K (DIN 72601, Part 6)	12 V, 18 W	1	SV8.5-8	15 × 41 mm	
Form K (DIN 72601, Part 6)	24 V, 18 W	1	SV8.5-8	15 × 41 mm	
Form R (DIN 72601, Part 6)	6 V, 18 W	1	BA15s		
Form R (DIN 72601, Part 6)	12 V, 18 W	1	BA15s		
Form R (DIN 72601, Part 6)	24 V, 18 W	1	BA15s		
Form S (DIN 72601, Part 7)	6 V, 18 / 5 W	2	BAY15d		
Form S (DIN 72601, Part 7)	12 V, 18 / 5 W	2	BAY15d		
Form S (DIN 72601, Part 7)	24 V, 18 / 5 W	2	BAY15d		

== United States and Canada ==
In the United States, entry 49 CFR 564 in the Code of Federal Regulations requires manufacturers of headlight bulbs, officially known as "replaceable light sources", to furnish the National Highway Traffic Safety Administration (NHTSA) with product specifications at least 60 days prior to first use. The specifications supplied by the manufacturer, on approval by NHTSA, are entered in Federal docket NHTSA-1998-3397. From then on, any light source made and certified by any manufacturer as conforming to the specifications is legal for use in headlamps certified as conforming to Federal Motor Vehicle Safety Standard 108. Light sources for vehicle lamps other than headlamps are not Federally regulated.

In Canada, vehicle headlamps may use light sources (bulbs) conforming to either the US or the international ECE regulations.

Replaceable Light Sources for Vehicle Headlamps
Bulb Type	Trade Number	Cap (Base)	Filaments	Nominal power @ 12.8v (High/Low beam where applicable)	Comments	Image
HB1	9004	P29t	2	65 / 45 W		
HB2	9003	P43t-38	2	60 / 55 W	H4 with stricter geometric tolerances	
HB3	9005	P20d (90°)	1	65 W		
HB3A	9005XS	P20d (straight)	1	65 W	HB3 w/180° straight base	
HB4	9006	P22d (90°)	1	55 W		
HB4A	9006XS	P22d (180° straight)	1	55 W	HB4 w/180° straight base	
HB5	9007	PX29t	2	65 / 55 W		
H13	9008	P26t	2	65 / 55 W		

Others
Category	Cap (Base)	Filaments	Nominal power	Comments	Image
PC194	T10 (if removable) or fixed to holder	1	14 V / 3.78W	Used on circuit boards for e.g. dash lights, gauge cluster backlights. Similar in size to W3W if with a T10 base.	
PC74	T1-3/4 (if removable) or fixed to holder	1	14 V / 1.4W	Used on circuit boards for e.g. dash lights, gauge cluster backlights.	

== Other countries ==
Others
Category	Cap (Base)	Filaments	Electrical Characteristics	Comments	Image
H3C		1	6 V / 55W, 12 V / 55W, 24 V / 70W	Japan (USA for unregulated auxiliary lamps only)	

== See also ==
- Sealed beam
- Automotive lighting
