= Automotive lighting =

Lighting system of a motor vehicle

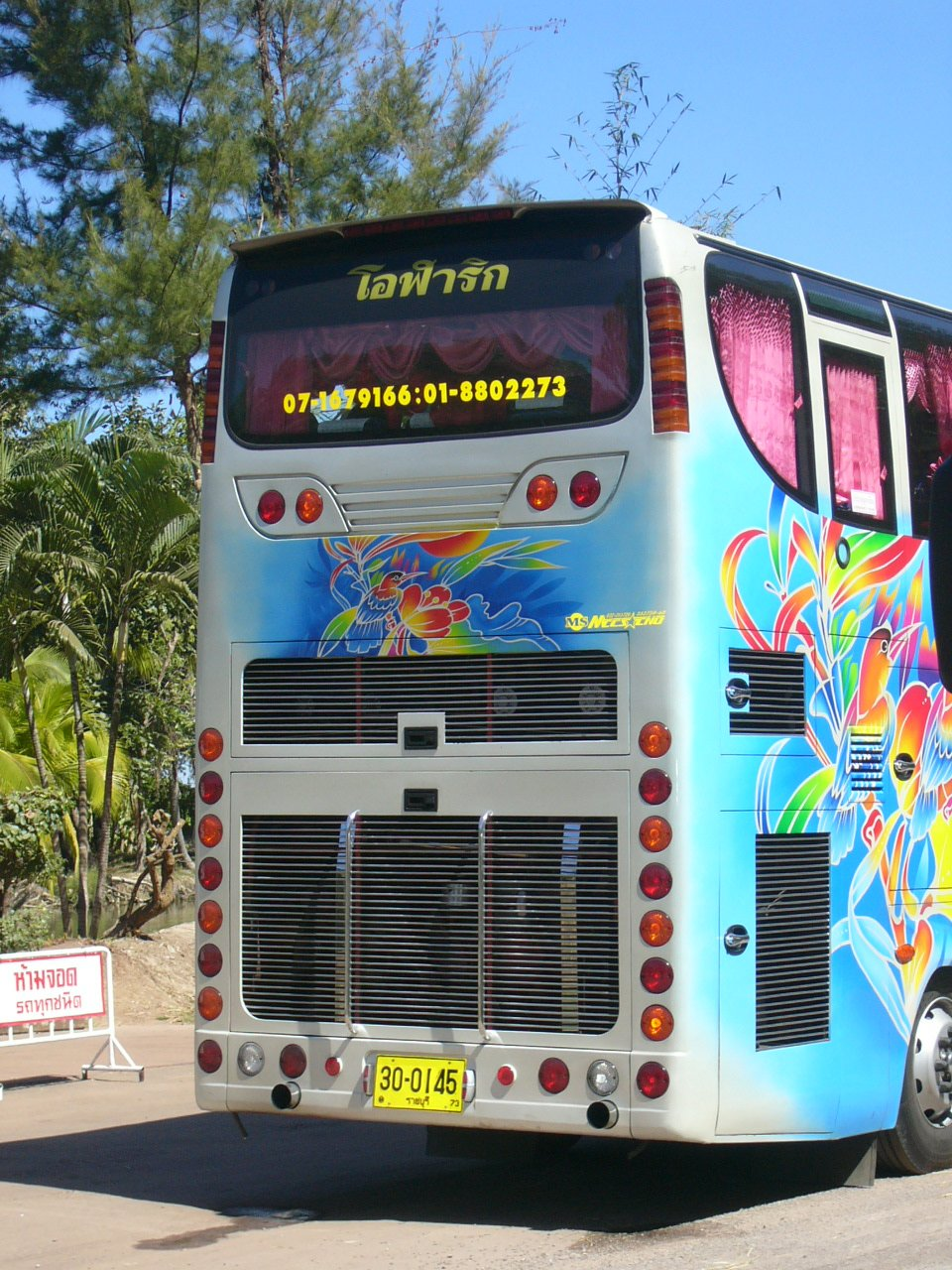
Extensively redundant rear lighting on a Thai tour bus

Automotive lighting is functional exterior lighting in vehicles. A motor vehicle has lighting and signaling devices mounted to or integrated into its front, rear, sides, and, in some cases, top. Various devices have the dual function of illuminating the road ahead for the driver, and making the vehicle visible to others, with indications to them of turning, slowing or stopping, etc., with lights also indicating the size of some large vehicles.

Many emergency vehicles have distinctive lighting equipment to warn drivers of their presence.

== History ==
Early road vehicles used fuelled lamps before the availability of electric lighting. The first Ford Model T used carbide lamps for headlights and oil lamps for tail lights. It did not have all-electric lighting as a standard feature until several years after its introduction. Dynamos for automobile headlights were first fitted around 1908 and became commonplace in 1920s automobiles.

Trafficators—signalling arms that flipped up, which later were lighted—were introduced in the early 1900s, and were actuated either mechanically or pneumatically. Tail lights and brake lights were introduced around 1915, and by 1919, low-beam or dipped beam headlights were available. Sealed beam headlights were introduced in 1936 and standardized as the only acceptable type in the US in 1940. Self-cancelling turn signals were developed in 1940. By 1945, headlights and signal lights were integrated into the body styling. Halogen headlights were developed in Europe in 1960. High-intensity discharge (HID) headlights were produced starting in 1991. In 1993, the first LED tail lights were installed on mass-production automobiles, with LED headlights subsequently being introduced in the 2000s as more powerful LEDs became available.

== Colour of light emitted ==
The colour of light emitted by vehicle lights is largely standardized by established conventions, first codified in the 1949 Geneva Convention on Road Traffic and later specified in the 1968 United Nations Vienna Convention on Road Traffic. With some regional exceptions, lights facing rearward must emit red light, side-facing lights and all turn signals must emit amber light, and lights facing forward must emit white or selective yellow light. No other colours are permitted except on emergency vehicles. Vehicle lighting colour specifications can differ somewhat in countries that have not signed the 1949 and/or 1968 Conventions; examples include turn signals and side marker lights in North America, as described in those lights' sections later in this article.

== Forward illumination ==
Forward illumination is provided by high- ("main", "full", "driving") and low- ("dip", "dipped", "passing") beam headlights, which may be augmented by auxiliary fog lights, driving lights, or cornering lights.

=== Headlights ===
==== Low beam (dipped beam, passing beam, meeting beam) ====
ISO symbol for low beam

Low beam (also called dipped beam, passing beam, or meeting beam) headlights provide adequate forward and lateral illumination without dazzling other road users with excessive glare. This beam is specified for use whenever other vehicles are present ahead.

UN ECE regulations for dipped beam headlights specify a beam with a sharp, asymmetric cut-off; the half of the beam closest to oncoming drivers is flat and low, while the half of the beam closest to the outside of the road slopes up and towards the near side of the roadway. This permits a functional compromise where it is possible to substantially prevent glare for oncoming drivers, while still allowing adequate illumination for drivers to see pedestrians, road signs, hazards, etc. on their side of the road.

The United States and Canada use proprietary FMVSS / CMVSS standards instead of UN ECE regulations. These standards contain regulations for dipped beam headlights that also specify a beam with a sharp, asymmetric cut-off; the half of the beam closest to oncoming drivers is also flat and low, but not as low as prescribed in UN ECE regulations. The half of the beam closest to the outside of the road is also flat, but higher than the half closest to oncoming vehicles. This results in substantially increased glare for oncoming drivers and also poorer illumination of the near side of the roadway in comparison to headlights conforming to UN ECE regulations.

==== High beam (main beam, driving beam, full beam) ====
ISO symbol for high beam

High beam (also called main beam, driving beam, or full beam) headlights provide an intense, centre-weighted distribution of light with no particular glare control. Therefore, they are only suitable for use when alone on the road, as the glare they produce will dazzle other drivers.

UN ECE Regulations permit higher-intensity high-beam headlights than allowed under U.S. and Canadian FMVSS / CMVSS standards.

=== Auxiliary lights ===
==== Driving lights ====
ISO symbol for long-range lights

Auxiliary high beam lights may be fitted to provide high-intensity light to enable the driver to see at longer range than the vehicle's high beam headlights. Such lights are most notably fitted on rally cars, and are occasionally fitted to production vehicles derived from or imitating such cars. They are common in countries with large stretches of unlit roads, or in regions such as the Nordic countries that receive fewer daylight hours during winter.

"Driving light" is a term hailing from the early days of night time driving, when it was relatively rare to encounter an opposing vehicle. Only on occasions when opposing drivers passed each other would the low (dipped or "passing") beam be used. The high beam was therefore known as the "driving beam", and this terminology is still found in international UN Regulations, which do not distinguish between a vehicle's primary (mandatory) and auxiliary (optional) upper/driving beam lights. The "driving light" term has been supplanted in US regulations by the functionally descriptive term "auxiliary high-beam light".

Many countries regulate the installation and use of driving lights. For example, in Russia, each vehicle may have no more than three pairs of driving lights (including the original lights), and in Paraguay, auxiliary driving lights must be off and covered with opaque material when the vehicle is operated in urban areas.

==== Front fog lights ====
ISO symbol for front fog lights

Front fog lights provide a wide, bar-shaped beam of light with a sharp cutoff at the top, and are generally aimed and mounted low. They may produce white or selective yellow light, and were designed for use at low speed to increase the illumination directed towards the road surface and verges in conditions of poor visibility due to fog, dust or snow.

They are sometimes used in place of dipped-beam headlights, reducing glare from fog or falling snow, although the legality of using front fog lights without low-beam headlights varies by jurisdiction.

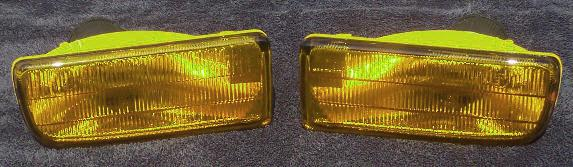
Selective yellow fog lights

In most countries, weather conditions rarely necessitate the use of front fog lights and there is no legal requirement for them, so their primary purpose is frequently cosmetic. They are often available as optional extras or only on higher trim levels of many cars. Since as early as the 2020s, several car manufacturers have noticeably omitted the front fog lights from many of their latest models, as more recent high-tech lighting technologies such as daytime running lamps (DRLs) and LEDs connected to automatic high-beam systems negate the use of fog lights. However, some manufacturers who still offer fog lights as standard equipment in certain model trims have diversified its use to function also as an automatic lighting delay for vehicles, to light up surroundings and roadside curbs after being parked.

An SAE study has shown that in the United States, more people inappropriately use their fog lights in dry weather than use them properly in poor weather. Because of this, use of the fog lights when visibility is not seriously reduced is often prohibited in most jurisdictions; for example, in Australia, "The driver of a vehicle must not use any fog light fitted to the vehicle unless the driver is driving in fog, mist or under other atmospheric conditions that restrict visibility."

The respective purposes of front fog lights and driving lights are often confused, due in part to the misconception that fog lights are always selective yellow, while any auxiliary light that makes white light is a driving light. Automakers and aftermarket parts and accessories suppliers frequently refer interchangeably to "fog lights" and "driving lights" (or "fog/driving lights").

==== Cornering lights ====
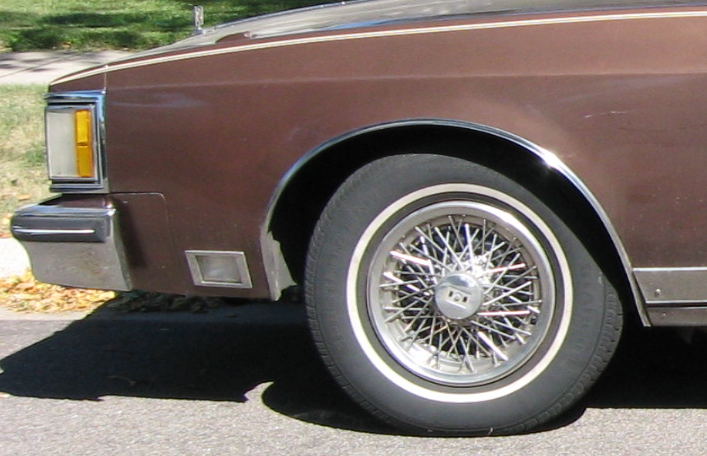
A cornering light on a 1983 Oldsmobile 98

On some models, cornering lights provide steady-intensity white light for lateral illumination in the direction of an intended turn or lane change. They are generally actuated in conjunction with the turn signals, and they may be wired to also illuminate when the vehicle is shifted into reverse gear. Some modern vehicles activate the cornering light on one or the other side when the steering wheel input reaches a predetermined angle in that direction, regardless of whether a turn signal has been activated.

American technical standards contain provisions for front cornering lights as well as rear cornering lights. Cornering lights have traditionally been prohibited under international UN Regulations, though provisions have recently been made to allow them as long as they are only operable when the vehicle is travelling at less than 40 kilometres per hour (about 25 mph).

==== Spotlights ====
Police cars, emergency vehicles, and vehicles competing in road rallies are sometimes equipped with an auxiliary spotlight, sometimes called an "alley light", in a swivel-mounted housing attached to one or both A-pillars, aimed by a handle protruding through the pillar into the vehicle.

== Conspicuity, signal and identification lights ==
Conspicuity devices are lights and reflectors that are intended to make a vehicle more conspicuous and visible with respect to its presence, position, direction of travel, change in direction, or deceleration. Such lights may light steadily, blink, or flash, depending on their intended and regulated function. Most must be fitted in pairs—one left and one right—though some vehicles have multiple pairs (such as two left and two right stop lights) and/or redundant light sources (such as one left and one right stop light, each containing two bulbs).

=== Front ===
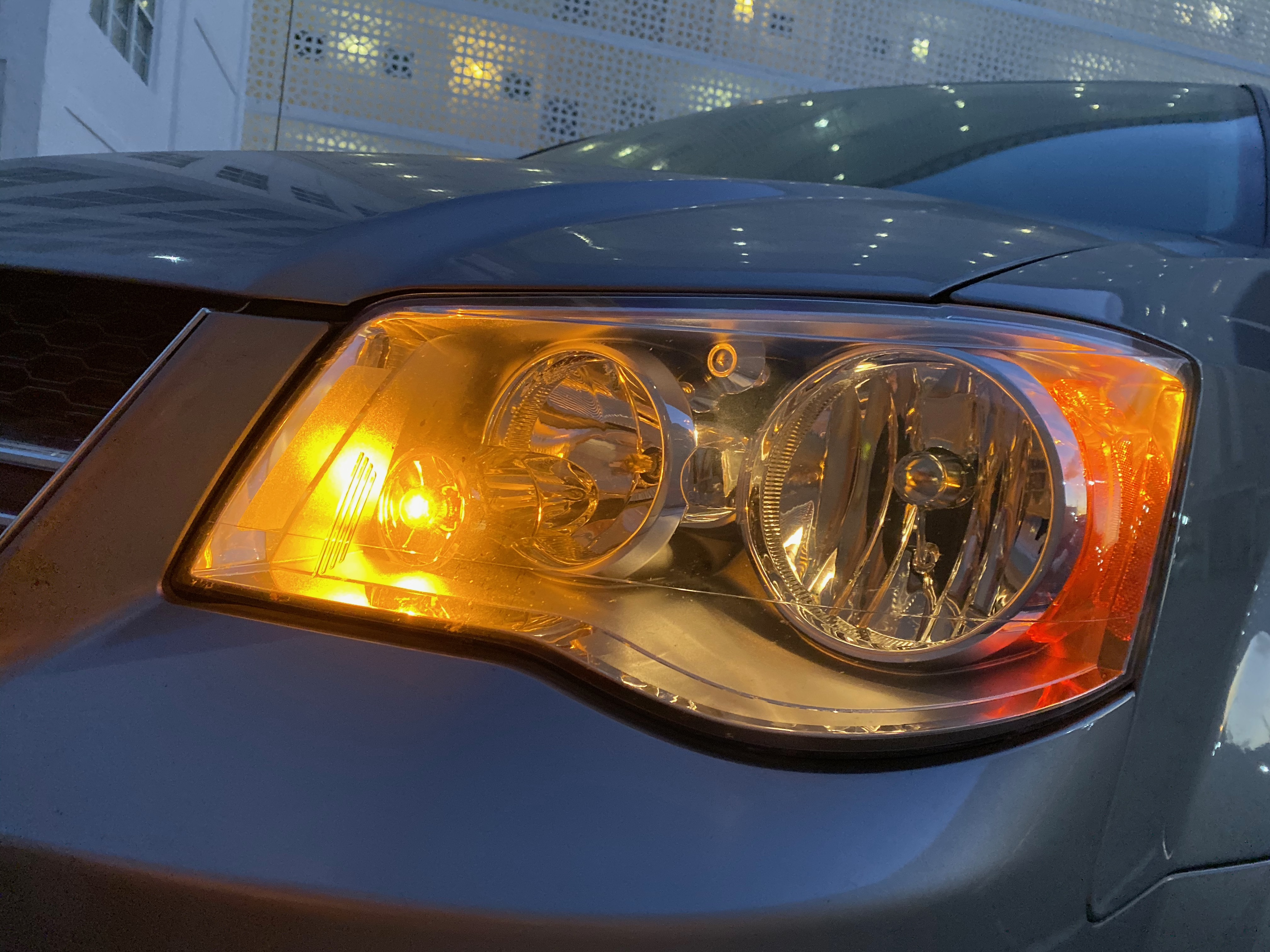
Front position light lit within front light assembly on a 2018 Dodge Grand Caravan SE

==== Front position lights ====
ISO symbol for position lights

Front position lights (known as parking lights in North America and front sidelights in the UK) provide nighttime standing-vehicle conspicuity. They are designed to use little electricity so they can be left on when parked for prolonged periods of time. Despite the UK term, these are not the same as the side marker lights described below. The front position lights on any vehicle must emit white light, with the exception of motorcycles, which may have amber front position lights. In the US, Canada, Mexico, Iceland, Japan, New Zealand, and Australia (only if combined with a side marker), South Korea, North Korea, Vietnam, China, Thailand, Cambodia, Laos, and much of the Middle East, they may emit amber light on any vehicle. The "city light" terminology for front position lights derives from the practice, formerly adhered to in cities like Moscow, London and Paris, of driving at night in urban areas using these low-intensity lights rather than the vehicle's headlights.

In Germany, the StVZO (Road Traffic Licensing Regulations) calls for a different function provided by these lights: with the vehicle's ignition switched off, the operator may activate a low-intensity white light at the front and red light at the rear on either the left or right side. This function is used when parking in narrow unlit streets to provide parked-vehicle conspicuity to approaching drivers. This function, which is optional under UN and US regulations, is served passively in the United States by mandatory side marker retroreflectors.

==== Daytime running lights ====
ISO symbol for daytime running lights

===== Installation =====
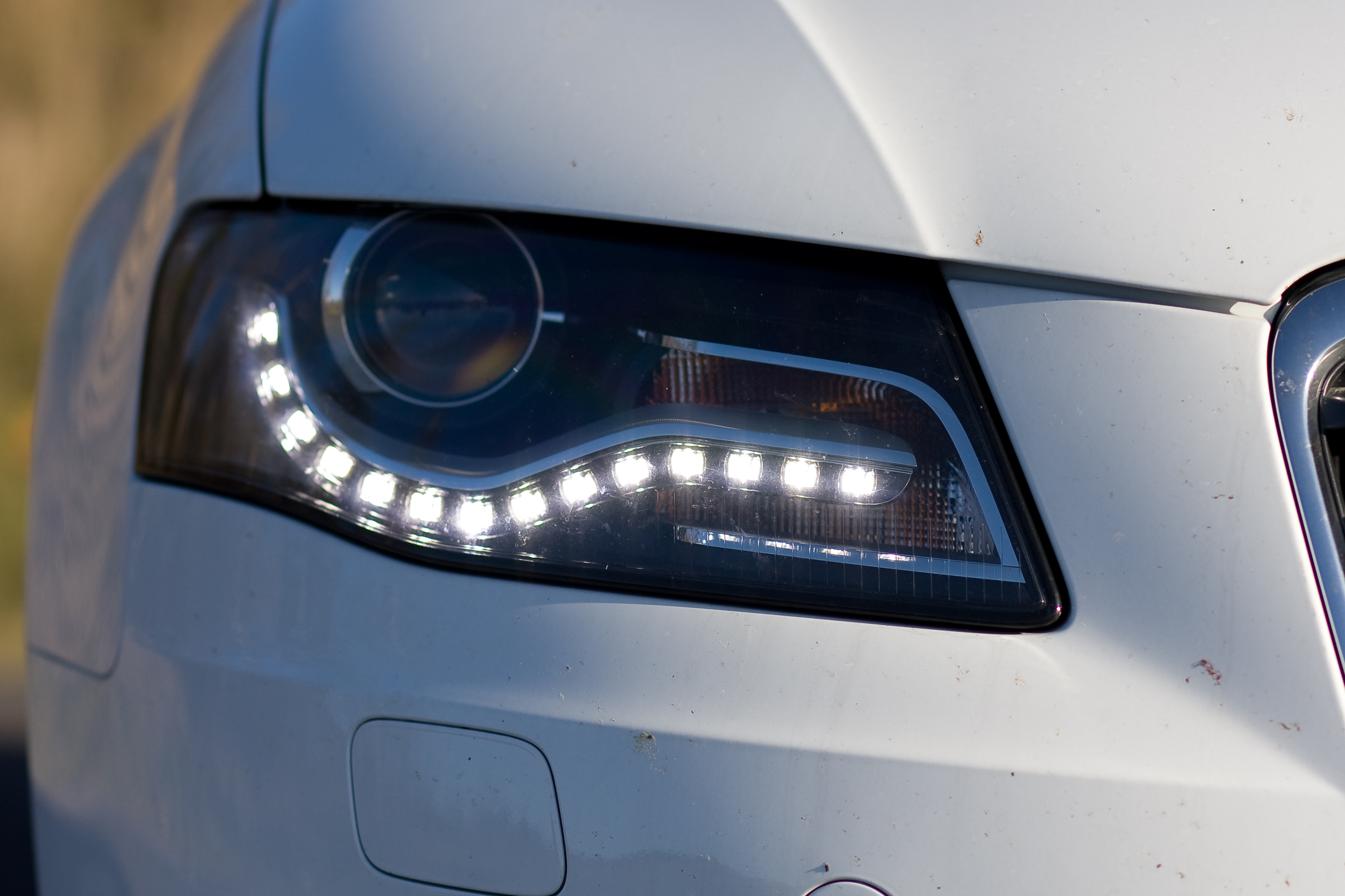
LED daytime running lights on an Audi A4 (B8)

Some countries permit or require vehicles to be equipped with daytime running lights (DRLs). Depending on the regulations of the country for which the vehicle is built, these may be functionally dedicated lights, or the function may be provided by the low beam or high beam headlights, the front turn signals, or the front fog lights.

Passenger cars and small delivery vans first type approved to UN Regulation 48 on or after 7 February 2011, and large vehicles (trucks and buses) type approved since August 2012, must be equipped with DRLs. Functional piggybacking, such as using the headlights, front turn signals, or fog lights as DRLs, is not permitted; the EU Directive requires functionally specific daytime running lights compliant with UN Regulation 87 and mounted to the vehicle in accord with UN Regulation 48.

Prior to the DRL mandate, countries requiring daytime lights permitted low beam headlights to provide that function. National regulations in Canada, Sweden, Norway, Slovenia, Finland, Iceland, and Denmark require hardwired automatic DRL systems of varying specification. DRLs are permitted in many countries where they are not required, but prohibited in other countries not requiring them.

Front, side, and rear position lights are permitted, required, or forbidden to illuminate in combination with daytime running lights, depending on the jurisdiction and the DRL implementation. Likewise, according to jurisdictional regulations, DRLs mounted within a certain distance of turn signals are permitted or required to extinguish or dim down to parking light intensity individually when the adjacent turn signal is operating.

===== Intensity and colour =====
UN Regulation 87 stipulates that DRLs must emit white light with an intensity of at least 400 candela on axis and no more than 1200 candela in any direction.

In the US, daytime running lights may emit either amber or white light, and may produce up to 7,000 candela. This has provoked a large number of complaints about glare.

==== Dim-dip lights ====
UK regulations briefly required vehicles first used on or after 1 April 1987 to be equipped with a "dim-dip" device or special low-intensity running lights, except such vehicles as complying fully with UN Regulation 48 regarding the installation of lighting equipment. A dim-dip device operates the dipped beam headlights at between 10% and 20% of normal low-beam intensity. Running lights permitted as an alternative to dim-dip were required to emit at least 200 candela straight ahead, and no more than 800 candela in any direction. In practice, most vehicles were equipped with the dim-dip option rather than dedicated running lights.

The dim-dip systems were not intended for daytime use as DRLs. Rather, they operated if the engine was running and the driver switched on the position lights (called sidelights in the UK). Dim-dip was intended to provide a nighttime "town beam" with intensity between that of contemporary parking lights commonly used in city traffic after dark, and dipped beams; the former were considered insufficiently intense to provide improved conspicuity in conditions requiring it, while the latter were considered too glaring for safe use in built-up areas. The UK was the only country to require such dim-dip systems, though vehicles so equipped were sold in other Commonwealth countries with left-hand traffic.

In 1988, the European Commission successfully prosecuted the UK government in the European Court of Justice, arguing that the UK requirement for dim-dip was illegal under EC directives prohibiting member states from enacting vehicle lighting requirements not contained in pan-European EC directives. As a result, the UK requirement for dim-dip was quashed. Nevertheless, dim-dip systems remain permitted, and while such systems are not presently as common as they once were, dim-dip functionality was fitted on many new cars well into the 1990s.

=== Lateral ===
==== Side marker lights and reflectors ====
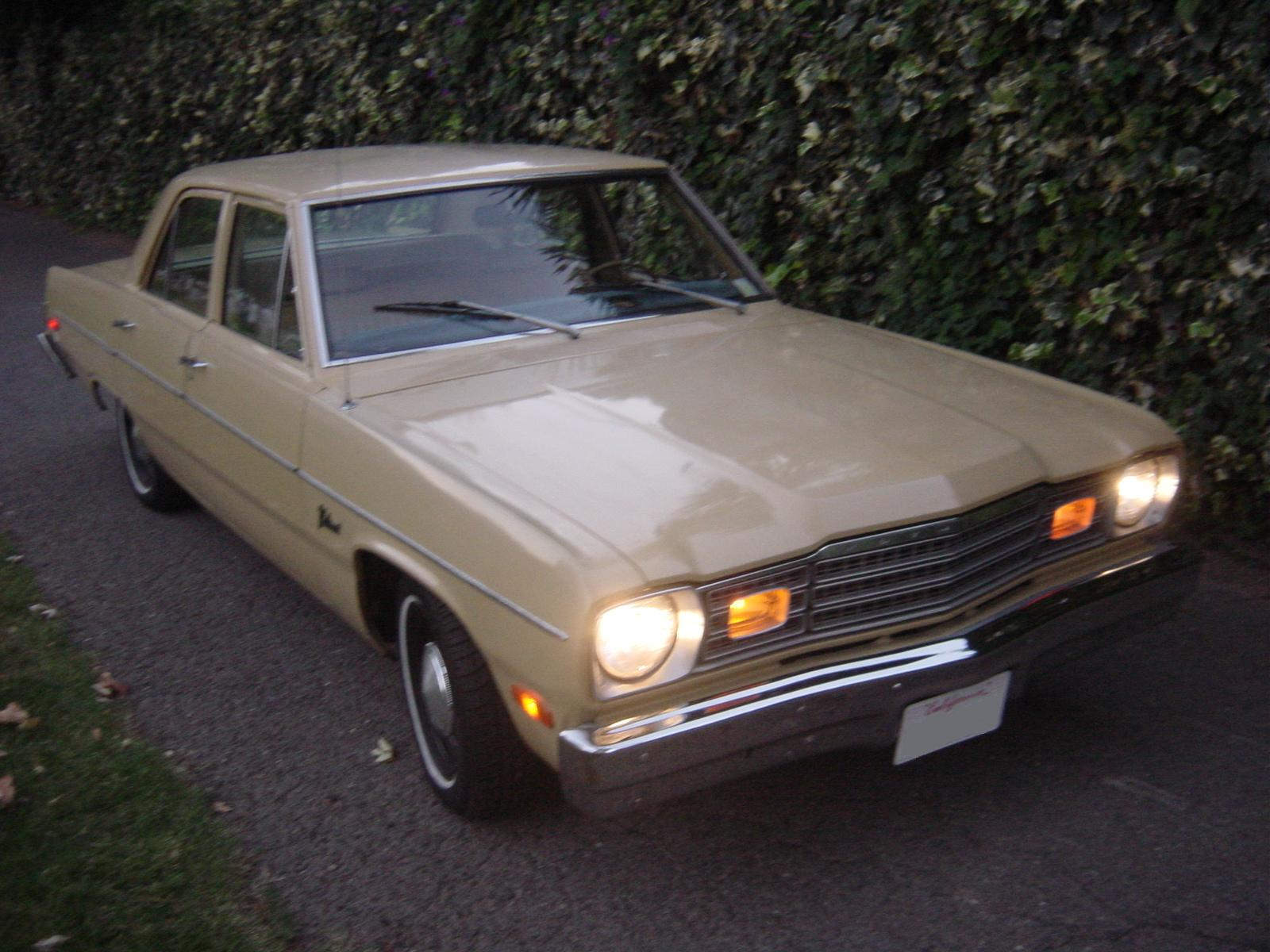
1974 Plymouth Valiant with headlights, amber front position lights, and side marker lights lit

In the United States, amber front and red rear side marker lights and retroreflectors are required. The law initially required lights or retroreflectors on vehicles manufactured after 1 January 1968. This was amended to require lights and retroreflectors on vehicles manufactured after 1 January 1970. These side-facing devices make the vehicle's presence, position and direction of travel clearly visible from oblique angles. The lights are wired to illuminate whenever the vehicles' parking lights and tail lights are on, including when the headlights are being used. Front amber side markers in the United States may be wired to flash in synchronous phase or opposite-phase with the turn signals; nevertheless, they are not required to flash at all. Side markers are permitted but not required on cars and light passenger vehicles outside the United States and Canada. If installed, they are required to be brighter and visible through a larger horizontal angle than US side markers, may flash only in synchronous phase with the turn signals (but are not required to flash), and they must be amber at the front and rear, except rear side markers may be red if they are grouped, combined, or reciprocally incorporated with another rear lighting function that is required to be red.

Australian Design Rule 45/01 provides for two different kinds of side marker light: a type for trucks and other large vehicles producing amber light to the front and red to the rear with no requirement to emit light to the side (intended for showing the overall length of long vehicles from in front and behind a combination) and the U.S. type amber front/red rear lights for passenger cars.

Side marker lights can be seen as the successor to "cowl lights" used on vehicles during the 1920s to 1930s, which were a pair of small lights installed at the top edges of the cowl between the hood and the windshield, and would serve as a reference point for oncoming traffic where the widest part of the body was. These were sometimes used in tandem with fender lights during the same time period, when fenders were separate from the body and only covered the wheels.

=== Turn signals ===
ISO symbol for turn signals, UNECE 121 symbol

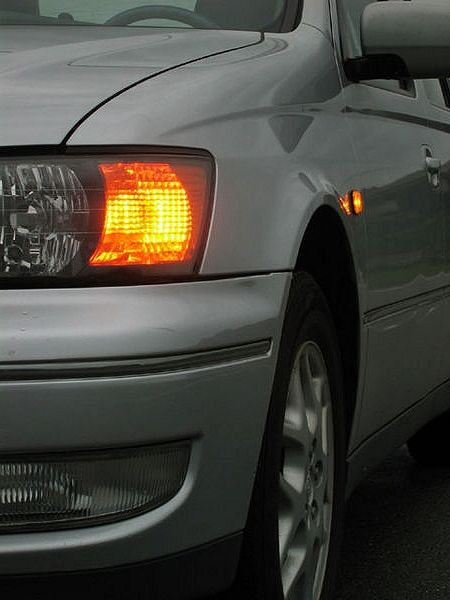
Illuminated front and side turn signals on a Toyota Vista

Direction indicator lights or turn signals, informally known as directional signals, directionals, blinkers, or indicators, are blinking lights mounted near the left and right front and rear corners of a vehicle, and sometimes on the sides or on the side mirrors of a vehicle (where they are called repeaters). They are activated by the driver on one side of the vehicle at a time to advertise intent to turn or change lanes towards that side, or used simultaneously as a hazard warning signal to warn other drivers of a vehicle parked on the road (see below).

For many years, turn signals' on-off operation was activated by a thermal flasher unit which used a heating element, leaf spring, and a bimetallic strip. When activated by the stalk switch on the steering column, the signal lights and heating element turned on. The heat caused the bimetallic strip to bend such that it threw the leaf spring over centre, opening the circuit and breaking power to the heating element and the signal lights. When the bimetallic strip cooled down, it would pull the leaf spring back over centre in the other direction, closing the contacts and again sending power to the lights and heating element. The cycle would repeat until the power to the thermal flasher was switched off by the stalk switch.

Thermal flashers gradually gave way to electromechanical relays; one of many control strategies with relay-type flashers is to use a relaxation oscillator chip to generate square waves to the relay coil, causing the relay contacts to open and close.

Modern cars now use a relaxation oscillator and solid-state relay built into the body control module to flash the lights, and use speakers to produce the distinctive clicking sound associated with turn signals, which was previously made by a relay or the leaf spring in a thermal flasher. If the stalk switch is not moved beyond the fixed left/right position and allowed to flip back, the control module will only flash the lights three times.

==== History of turn signals ====
Electric turn signal lights date from as early as 1907. In 1908, Alfredo Barrachini in Rome added electric lights inside the arms that turned on as they extended, but operation was still by a cable system. An early patent for a new style of turn signal was issued in 1909 to a British man named Percy Douglas-Hamilton, who came up with a system that used a hand on each side of the car, which could be illuminated to indicate a coming turn. Silent film star Florence Lawrence is also credited with introducing an innovative version of the signalling arm in 1914, a predecessor to the modern turn signal, and a mechanical brake signal. She did not patent these inventions, however, and received no credit or profit from them. In 1916, Springfield Fire Chief William R. Price created an electrical turn signal system consisting of a knob installed on a car dash that was connected to a gear which manipulated a signal box installed in the rear of the car. The signal was capable of signaling right, left, slow, and stop. The signal box was lit by a small light bulb at night. Price made the signal available to purchase to the community and submitted the invention to the U.S. Patent Office. Possibly the first factory installation of illuminated turn signals was on the Talbot 105 (as well as the 75 and 95), which used them at the front as well as at the rear from 1932 until 1935. The modern flashing turn signal was patented in 1938, and shortly after, most major automobile manufacturers offered this optional feature before it became mandatory in 1967. As of 2013, most countries require turn signals on all new vehicles that are driven on public roadways. Alternative systems of hand signals were used earlier and remain common for bicycles. Hand signals are also sometimes used when regular vehicle lights are malfunctioning or for older vehicles without turn signals.

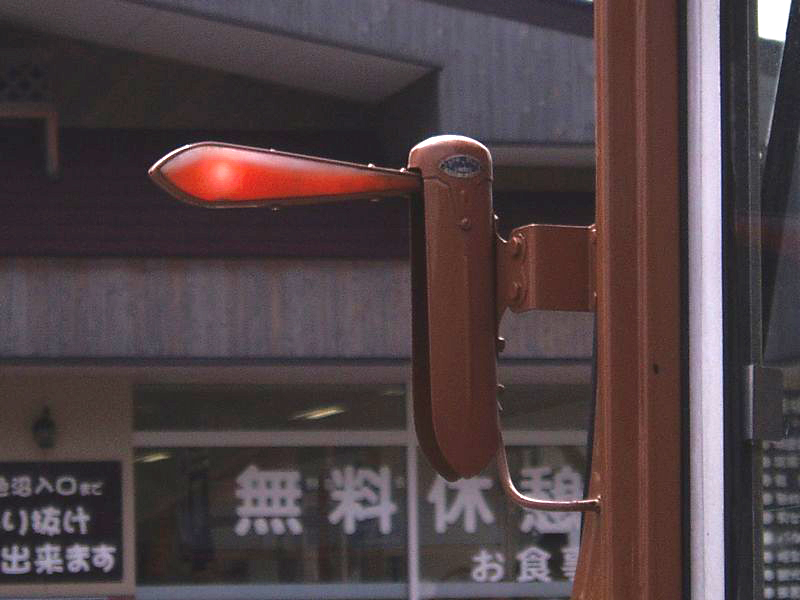
A trafficator deploys from a vehicle's side to indicate a turn in that direction.

Some cars from about 1900 to through 1966 used retractable semaphores called trafficators rather than flashing lights. They were commonly mounted high up behind the front doors and swung out to a horizontal position. They were fragile and could be easily broken off, and also had a tendency to stick in the closed or open position. They could be fitted with a fixed or flashing light.

After turn signals were introduced, regulations were brought in requiring them and laying out specifications that had to be met. Ultimately, standards governed minimum and maximum permissible intensity levels, minimum horizontal and vertical angles of visibility, and minimum illuminated surface area to ensure that they are visible at all relevant angles, do not dazzle those who view them, and are suitably conspicuous in all conditions, ranging from full darkness to full direct sunlight.

==== Side turn signals ====
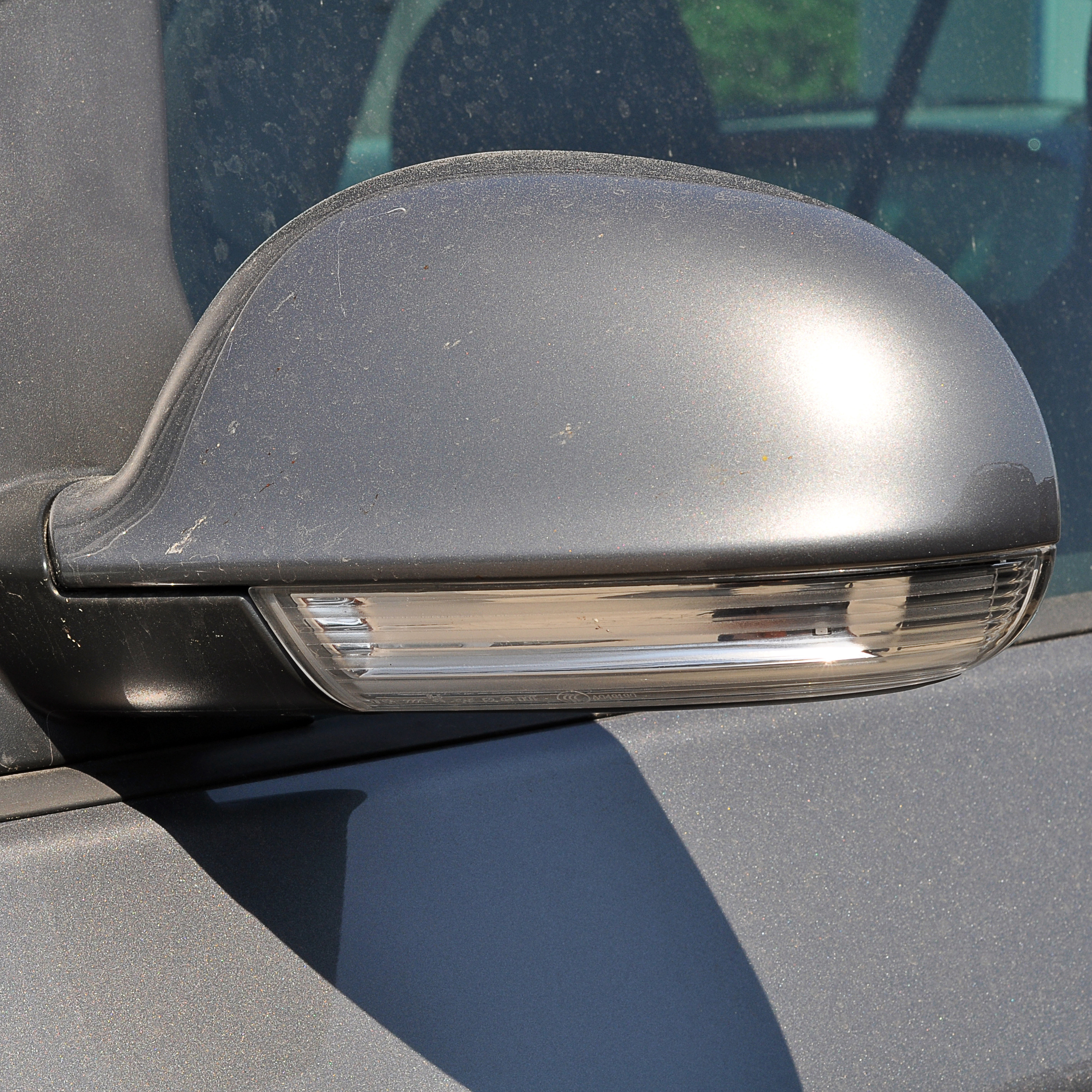
Mirror-mounted side turn signal repeater on a Volkswagen Golf Mk5

In most countries, cars must be equipped with side-mounted turn signal repeaters to make the turn indication visible laterally (i.e. to the sides of the vehicle) rather than just to the front and rear of the vehicle. These are permitted, but not required in the United States and Canada. As an alternative in both the United States and Canada, the front amber side marker lights may be wired to flash with the turn signals, but this is not mandatory. Mercedes-Benz introduced side turn signal repeaters integrated into the side-view mirrors in 1998, starting with its facelifted E-Class (W210). Since then, many automakers have been incorporating side turn signal devices into the mirror housings rather than mounting them on the vehicle's fenders. Some evidence suggests that mirror-mounted turn signals may be more effective than fender-mounted ones.

==== Electrical connection and switching ====
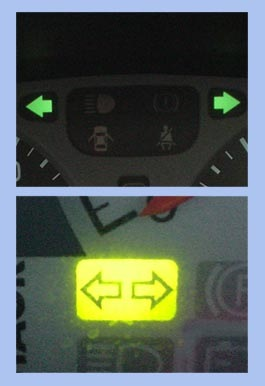
Two types of dashboard turn signal tell-tales

Turn signals are required to blink on and off, or "flash", at a steady rate of between 60 and 120 pulses per minute (1–2 Hz). International UN Regulations require that all turn signals flash in simultaneous phase; US regulations permit side marker lights wired for side turn signal functionality to flash in opposite-phase. An audio and/or visual tell-tale indicator is required, to advise the driver when the turn signals are activated and operating. This usually takes the form of one green light on the dashboard on cars from the 1950s or older, or two green indicator lights on cars from the 1960s to the present, and a rhythmic ticking sound generated electromechanically or electronically by the flasher. It is also required that the vehicle operator be alerted by much faster- or slower-than-normal flashing in the event a turn signal light fails.

Turn signals are, in almost every case, activated by a horizontal stalk protruding from the side of the steering column, though on some vehicles it protrudes from the dashboard. The driver raises or lowers the outboard end of the stalk in accord with the clockwise or anticlockwise direction the steering wheel is about to be turned.

In left-hand drive vehicles, the turn indicator stalk is usually located to the left of the steering wheel. In right-hand-drive vehicles, there is less consistency; it may be located to the left or to the right of the steering wheel. Regulations do not specify a mandatory location for the turn signal control, only that it be visible and operable by the driver, and—at least in North America—that it be labelled with a specific symbol if it is not located on the left side of the steering column. The international UN Regulations do not include analogous specifications.

Virtually all vehicles (except many motorcycles and commercial semi-tractors) have a turn indicator self-cancelling feature that returns the lever to the neutral (no signal) position as the steering wheel approaches the straight-ahead position after a turn has been made. Beginning in the late 1960s, using the direction-indicator lights to signal for a lane change was facilitated by the addition of a spring-loaded momentary signal-on position just shy of the left and right detents. The signal operates for however long the driver holds the lever partway towards the left or right turn signal detent. Some vehicles have an automatic lane-change indication feature; tapping the lever partway towards the left or right signal position and immediately releasing it causes the applicable turn indicators to flash three to five times.

Some transit buses, such as those in New York, have turn signals activated by floor-mounted momentary-contact footswitches on the floor near the driver's left foot (on left-hand drive buses). The foot-activated signals allow bus drivers to keep both hands on the steering wheel while watching the road and scanning for passengers as they approach a bus stop. New York City Transit bus drivers, among others, are trained to step continuously on the right directional switch while servicing a bus stop, to signal other road users they are intentionally dwelling at the stop, allowing following buses to skip that stop. This method of signalling requires no special arrangements for self-cancellation or passing.

==== Sequential turn signals ====
Sequential turn signals on an Audi A6

Sequential turn signals are a feature on some cars, wherein the turn signal function is provided by multiple lit elements that illuminate sequentially rather than simultaneously. The visual effect is one of outward motion in the direction of the intended turn or lane change. Sequential turn signals were factory fitted to 1965–1971-model Ford Thunderbirds, 1967–1973 Mercury Cougars, Shelby Mustangs between 1967 and 1970, 1969 Imperials, the Japanese-market 1971–1972 Nissan Cedric, Nissan Laurel and Nissan Bluebird, some Volkswagen, Audi, SEAT, Škoda and Porsche models, Toyota C-HR, some Peugeots and Ford Mustangs since 2010.

Two different systems were employed. The earlier, fitted to the 1965 through 1968 Ford-built cars and the 1971–1972 Nissan Cedric, employed an electric motor driving, through reduction gearing, a set of three slow-turning cams. These cams would actuate switches to turn on the lights in sequence. Later Ford cars and the 1969 Imperial used a transistorised control module with no moving parts to wear, break, or go out of adjustment.

FMVSS 108 has been officially interpreted as requiring all light sources in an active turn signal to illuminate simultaneously. Some vehicles, such as the 2010 and later Ford Mustang, are designed such that the first lit segment of the multi-unit light is considered as the official turn signal, with the segments illuminated afterward considered as auxiliary lights. Other US vehicles with sequential turn signals comply by illuminating all elements of the turn signal simultaneously, before sequentially turning them off.

==== Turn signal colour ====
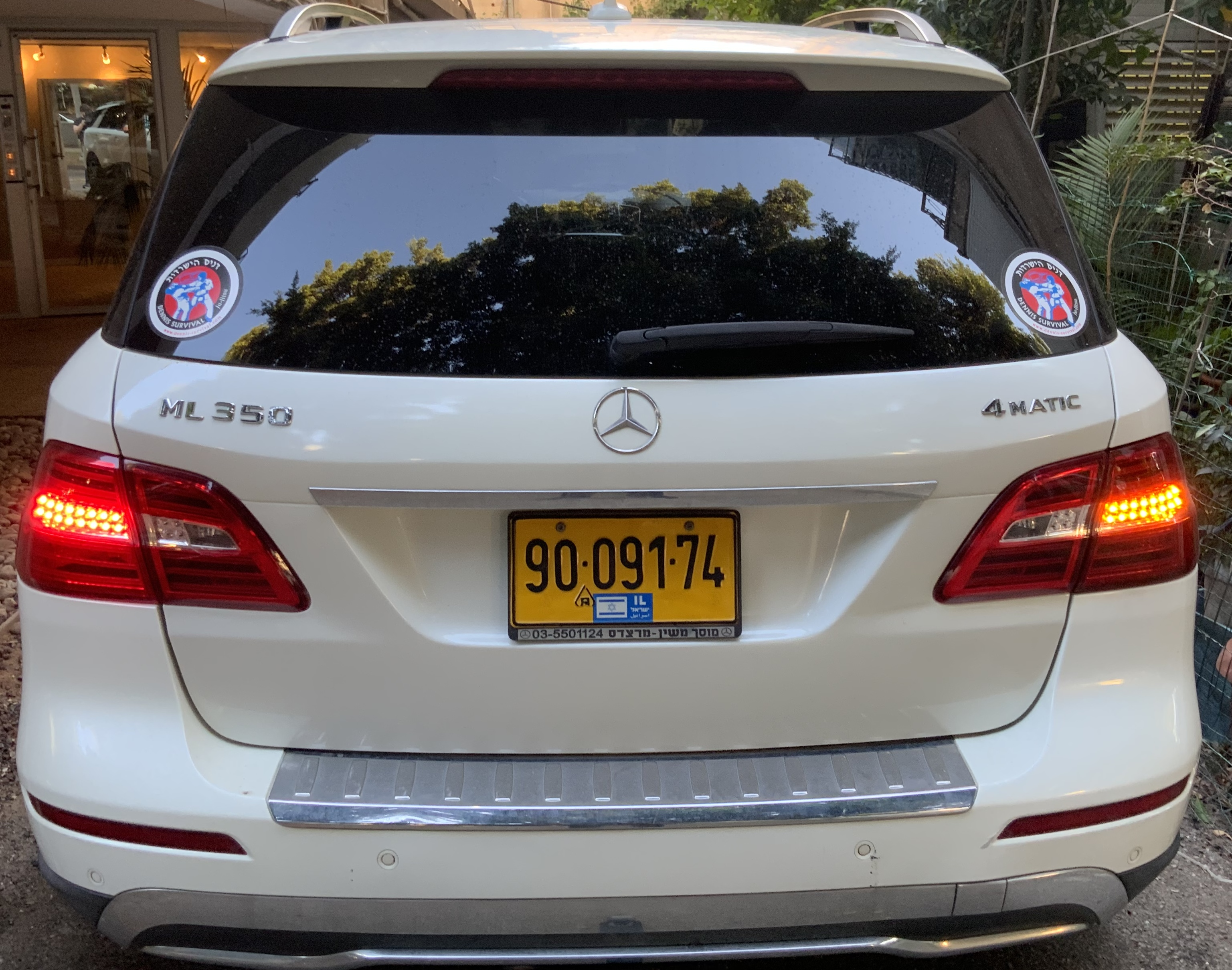
This Mercedes-Benz ML-Class has a US-spec red left rear turn signal and an international-spec amber right one.

Until the early 1960s, most front turn signals worldwide emitted white light and most rear turn signals emitted red light. The American auto industry voluntarily adopted amber front turn signals for most vehicles beginning in the 1963 model year, though the advent of amber signals was accompanied by legal stumbles in some states and front turn signals were still legally permitted to emit white light until FMVSS 108 took effect for the 1968 model year, whereupon amber became the only permissible front turn-signal colour. Currently, most countries outside the United States and Canada require that all front, side and rear turn signals produce amber light.

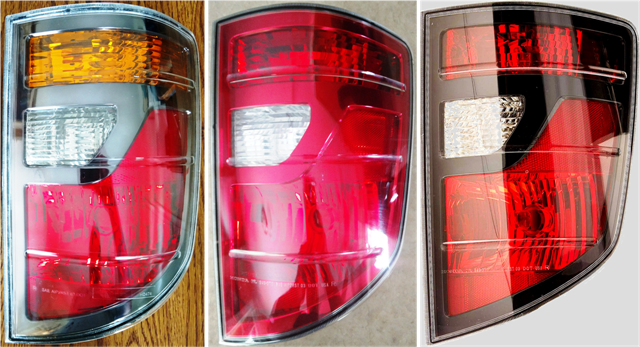
The Honda Ridgeline was built with amber rear turn signals from 2006 to 2008 and red ones from 2009 to 2014.

In Belgium, Brazil, Canada, the GCC countries, Israel, the Netherlands, Switzerland, Luxembourg,, New Zealand, and the US, the rear signals may be amber or red. Red turn signals can also be found in countries having trade agreements with the US, such as Mexico and South Korea. Proponents of red rear turn signals have claimed that they are less costly to manufacture, and automakers use the turn signal colour as a styling element to differentiate vehicles of different model years. Proponents of amber rear turn signals say they are more easily discernible as turn signals. It has been recognised since the 1960s that amber turn signals are more quickly spotted than red ones. A 2008 US study by the National Highway Traffic Safety Administration suggests vehicles with amber rear signals rather than red ones are up to 28% less likely to be involved in certain kinds of collisions, a followup 2009 NHTSA study determined there to be a significant overall safety benefit to amber rather than red rear turn signals, US studies in the early 1990s demonstrated improvements in the speed and accuracy of drivers' reactions to the stop lights of vehicles ahead when the turn signals were amber rather than red, and NHTSA determined in 2015 that amber rear turn signals can be provided at comparable cost to red ones.

There is evidence that turn signals with colourless clear lenses and amber bulbs may be less discernible in bright sunlight than those with amber lenses and colourless bulbs.

==== Colour durability ====
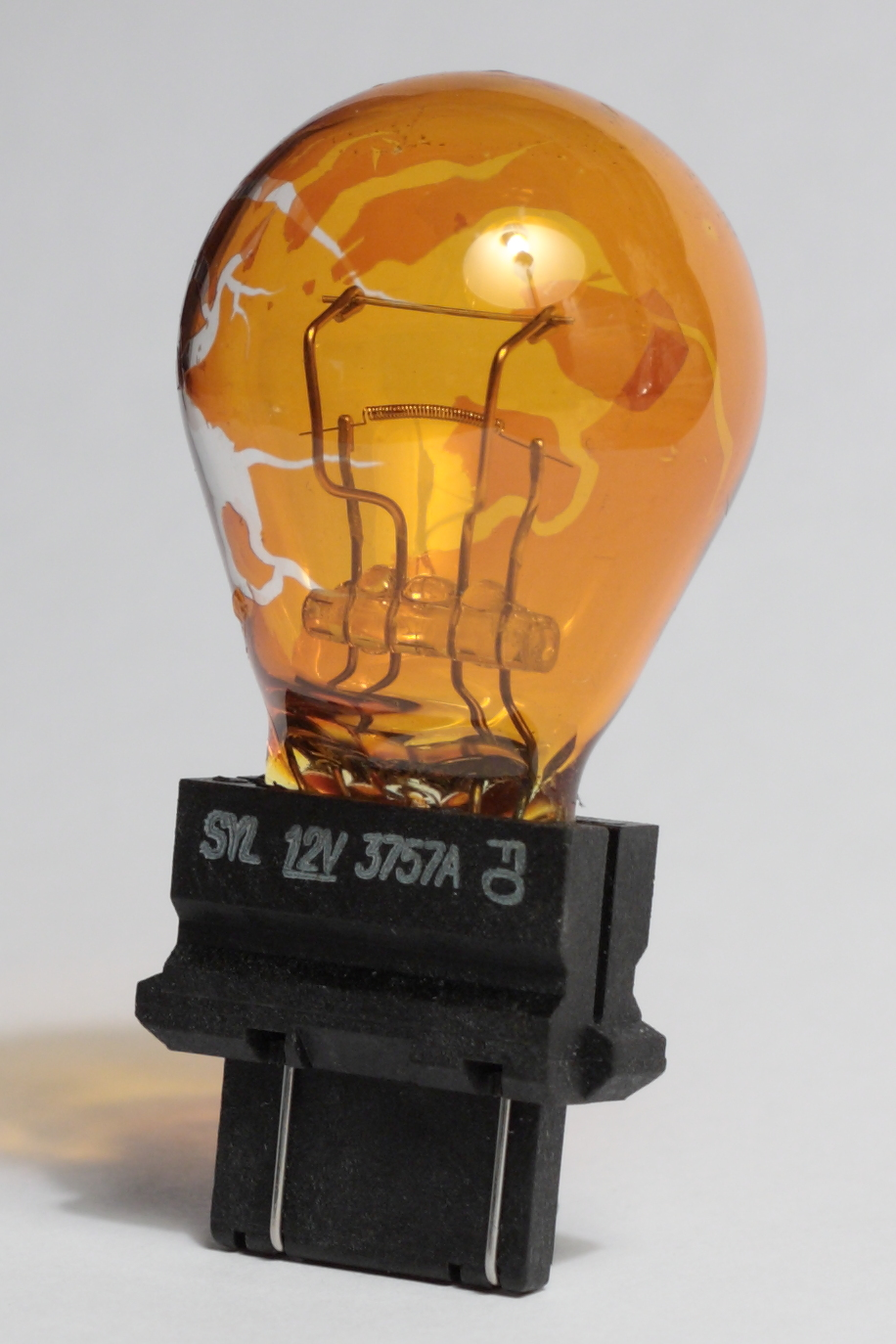
The colour coating has started to flake off this PY27/7W bulb, a relatively new problem.

The amber bulbs commonly used in turn signals with colourless lenses are no longer made with cadmium glass, since various regulations worldwide, including the European RoHS directive, banned cadmium because of its toxicity. Amber glass made without cadmium is relatively costly, so most amber bulbs are now made with clear glass dipped in an amber coating. With accumulated heat-cool cycles, though, some of these coatings may flake off the bulb glass, or the colour may fade. This causes the turn signal to emit white light rather than the required amber light.

The international regulation on motor vehicle bulbs requires manufacturers to test bulbs for colour endurance. However, no test protocol or colour durability requirement is specified. Discussion is ongoing within the Groupe des Rapporteurs d'Éclairage, the UNECE working group on vehicular lighting regulation, to develop and implement a colour durability standard.

Rather than using an amber bulb, some lamps with colourless outer lenses contain a clear bulb with a coloured inner lens or bulb shield. Lamps with LEDs light sources can appear colourless when off and provide the required colour of light when lit, without need of coloured lenses or shields.

=== Rear ===
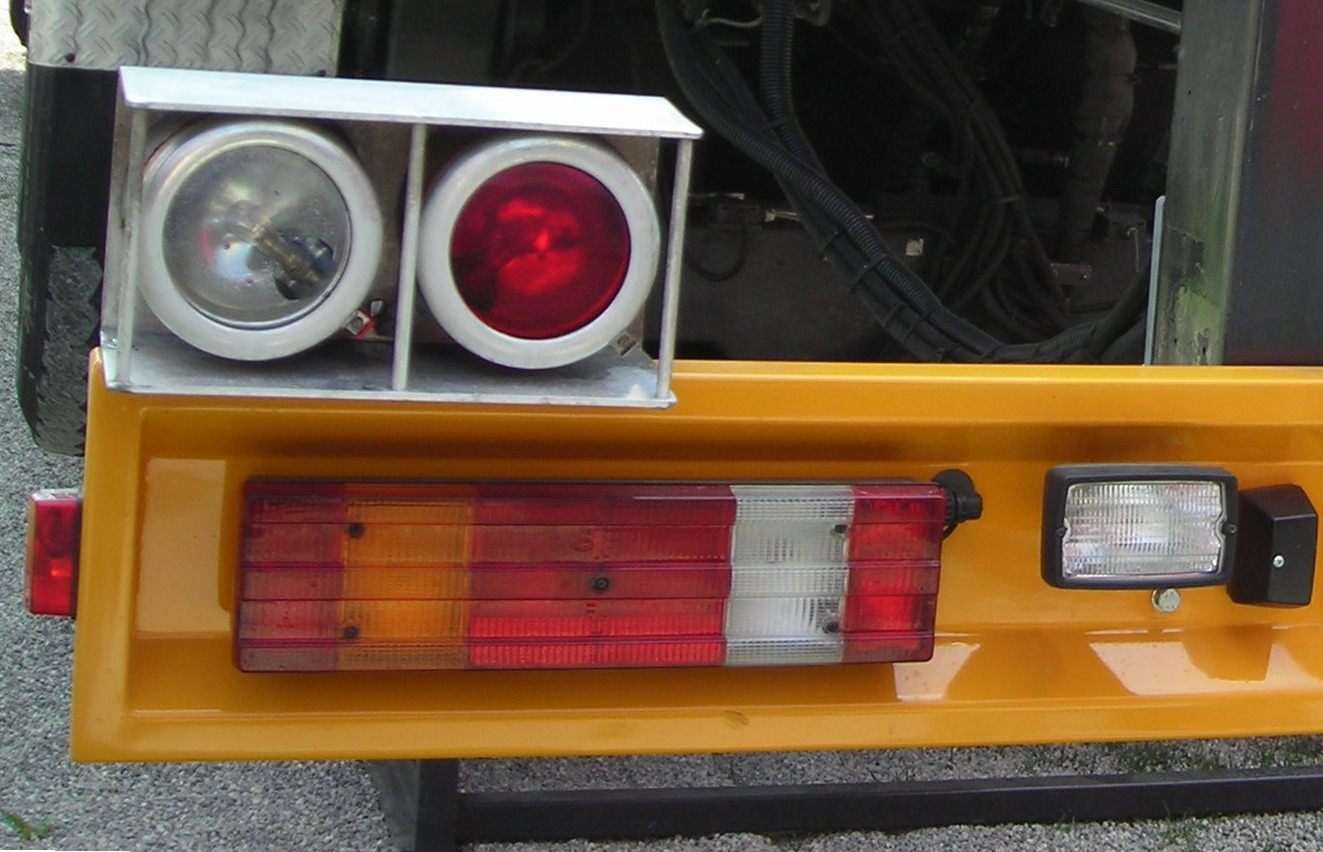
Double taillights mounted on a road-rail vehicle

==== Rear position lights (tail lights) ====
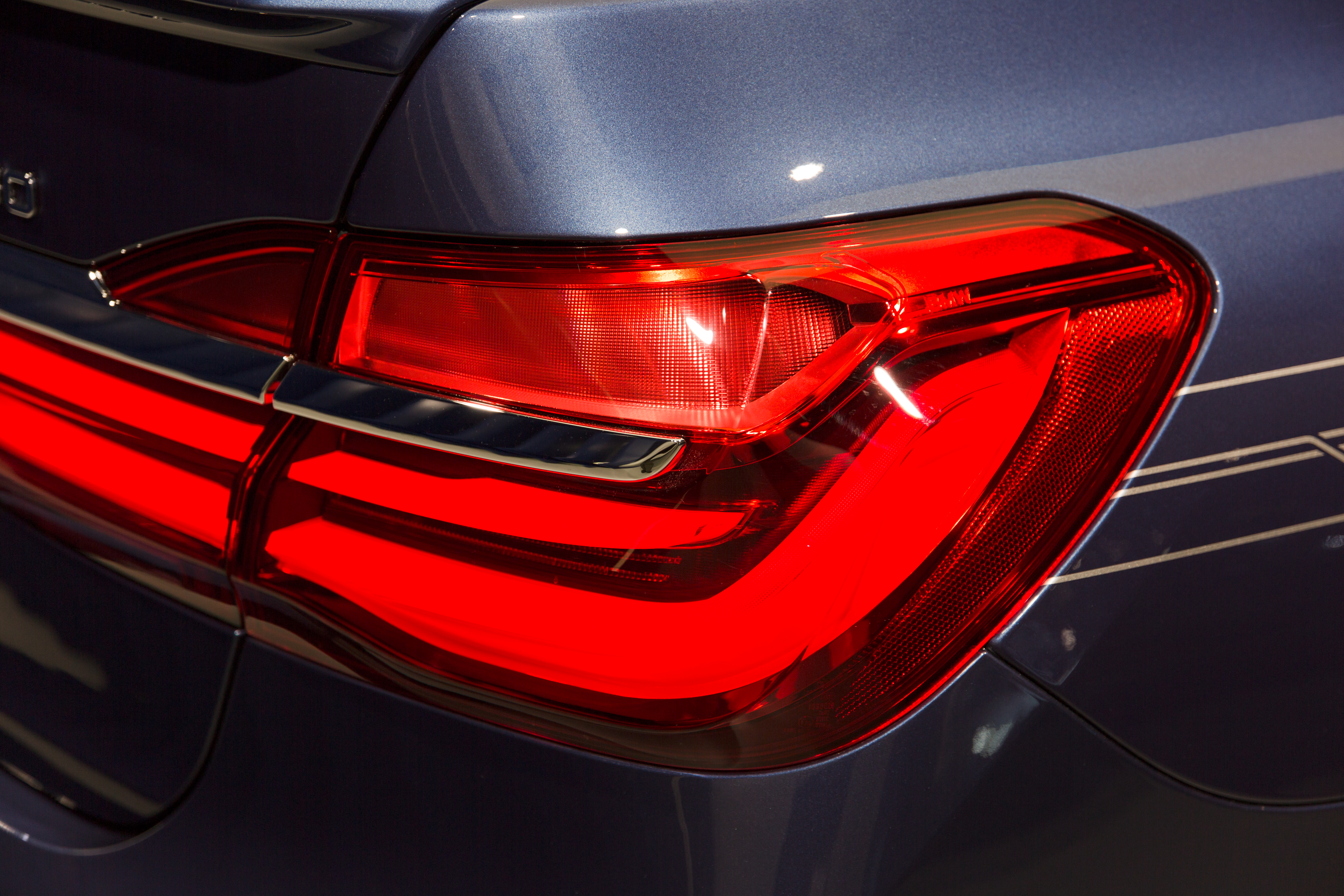
Full LED rear lights on a BMW 7 Series (G11)

Conspicuity for the rear of a vehicle is provided by rear position lights (also called tail lights). These are required to produce only red light and to be wired such that they are lit whenever the front position lights are lit, including when the headlights are on. Rear position lights may be combined with the vehicle's stop lights or be separate from them. In combined-function installations, the lights produce brighter red light as stop lights and dimmer red light as rear position lights. Regulations worldwide stipulate minimum intensity ratios between the bright (stop) and dim (position) modes, so that a vehicle displaying rear position lights will not be mistakenly interpreted as showing stop lights and vice versa.

==== Stop lights (brake lights) ====
Red steadily lit rear lights, brighter than the rear position lights, are activated when the driver applies the vehicle's brakes and warn vehicles behind to prepare to stop. These are formally called "stop lamps" in technical standards and regulations and in the Vienna Convention on Road Traffic, though they are often informally called brake lights. They are required to be fitted in multiples of two, symmetrically at the left and right edges of the rear of every vehicle. International UN regulations No. 7 specify a range of acceptable intensity for a stop light of 60 to 185 candela. In North America, where the UN regulations are not recognised, the acceptable range for a single-compartment stop light is 80 to 300 candela.

===== Centre high mount stop lamp (CHMSL) =====
In the United States and Canada since 1986, in Australia and New Zealand since 1990, and in Europe and other countries applying UN Regulation 48 since 1998, a central stop (brake) light mounted higher than the vehicle's left and right stop lights is also required. The so-called "centre high mount stop lamp", or CHMSL (pronounced /ˈtʃɪmzəl/), is sometimes informally called the "centre brake light", the "third brake light", the "eye-level brake light", the "safety brake light", or the "high-level brake light". The CHMSL may use one or more filament bulbs or LEDs, or a strip of neon tubing as its light source.

The CHMSL is intended to provide a warning to drivers whose view of the vehicle's left and right stop lights is blocked by interceding vehicles. It also provides a redundant stop light signal in the event of a stop light malfunction. In North America, where rear turn signals are permitted to emit red light, the CHMSL also helps to differentiate brake lights from rear position lights and turn signal lights.

The CHMSL is generally required to illuminate steadily and not permitted to flash, though US regulators granted Mercedes-Benz a temporary 24-month exemption in January 2006 to the steady-light requirement to evaluate whether a flashing CHMSL provides an emergency stop signal that effectively reduces the likelihood of a crash.

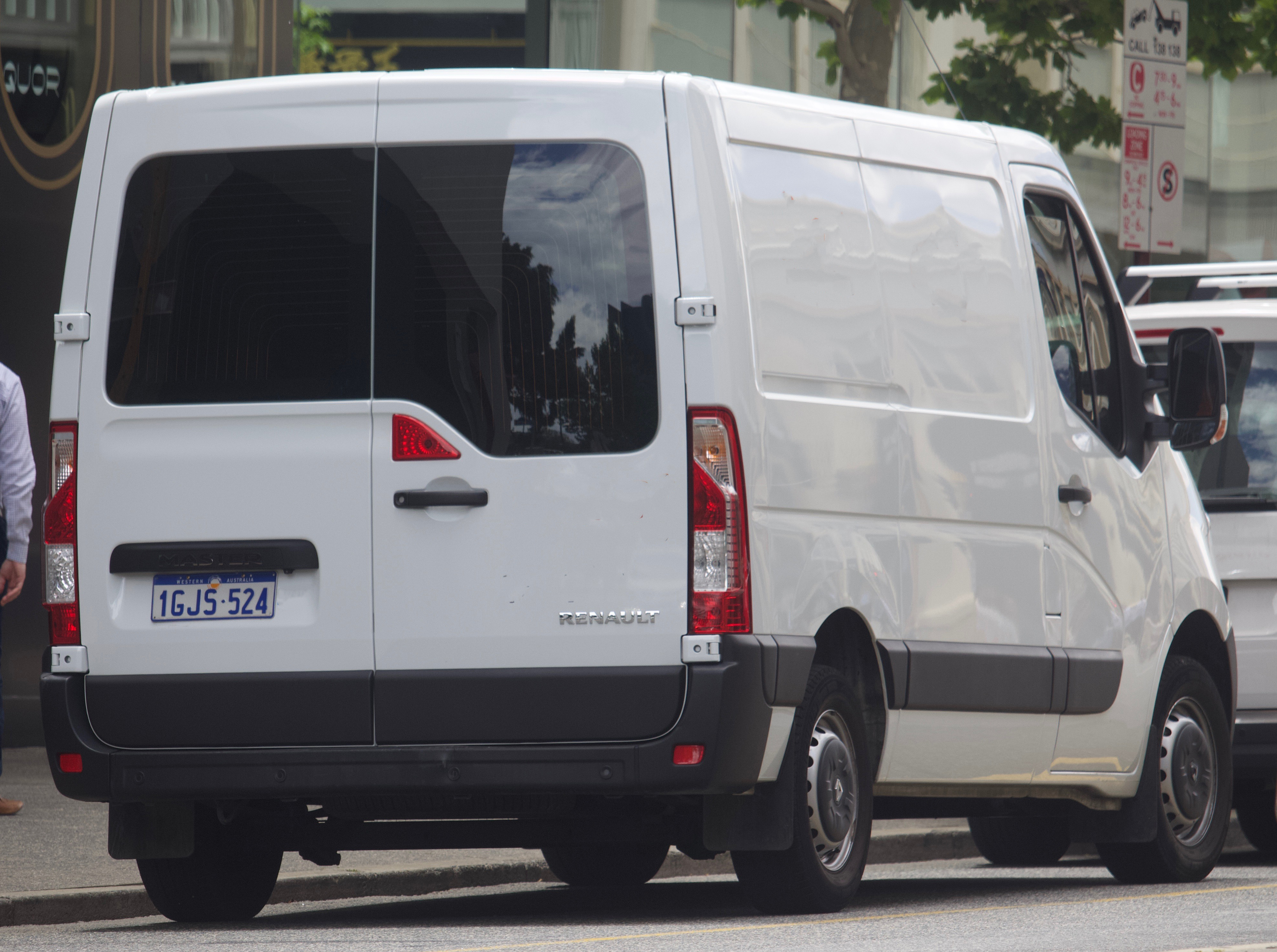
The rear end of a Renault Master. The offset third brake light above the door handle is visible.

On passenger cars, the CHMSL may be placed above the back glass, affixed to the vehicle's interior just inside the back glass, or integrated into the vehicle's deck lid or into a spoiler. Other specialised fitments are sometimes seen; the Jeep Wrangler and Land Rover Freelander have the CHMSL on a stalk fixed to the spare wheel carrier. Trucks, vans, and commercial vehicles sometimes have the CHMSL mounted to the trailing edge of the vehicle's roof. The CHMSL is required by regulations worldwide to be centred laterally on the vehicle, though UN Regulation 48 permits lateral offset of up to 15 cm if the vehicle's lateral centre is not coincident with a fixed body panel, but instead separates movable components such as doors. Such an offset can be seen on the third-generation Renault Master and first-generation Ford Transit Connect vans. The height of the CHMSL is also regulated, both in absolute terms and with respect to the mounting height of the vehicle's conventional left and right stop lights. Depending on the left and right lights' height, the lower edge of the CHMSL may be just above the left and right lights' upper edge.

The 1952 Volkswagen Bus was equipped with only one stop light, mounted centrally and higher than the left and right rear lights, which did not produce a stop light function. The 1968–1971 Ford Thunderbird could be ordered with optional supplemental high-mounted stop and turn signal lights integrated into the left and right interior trim surrounding the rear glass. The Oldsmobile Toronado (from 1971 to 1978) and the Buick Riviera (from 1974 to 1976) had similar dual high-mounted supplemental stop/turn lights as standard equipment; these were located on the outside of the vehicle below the bottom of the rear glass. This type of configuration was not widely adopted at the time. Car and lighting manufacturers in Germany experimented with dual high-mount supplemental stop lights in the early 1980s, but this effort, too, failed to gain wide popular or regulatory support.

Effective with the 1986 model year, the United States National Highway Traffic Safety Administration and Transport Canada mandated that all new passenger cars come equipped with a CHMSL. The requirement was extended to light trucks and vans for the 1994 model year. Early studies involving taxicabs and other fleet vehicles found that a third high-level stop light reduced rear-end collisions by about 50%. Once the novelty effect wore off as most vehicles on the road came to be equipped with a CHMSL, the crash-avoidance benefit declined. However, said benefit has not declined to zero, and a CHMSL has become so inexpensive to incorporate into a vehicle that it remains a cost-effective collision avoidance feature even at the long-term enduring crash-reduction benefit of 4.3%.

A NHTSA report suggests that a vehicle equipped with a CHMSL has 23.7% less risk to be involved as a lead vehicle in a chain collision and 16.0% less risk to be involved as a middle vehicle in such a collision.

===== Emergency stop signal (ESS) =====
Emergency stop signalling is a lighting function wherein the vehicle's stop (brake) lights and/or hazard/turn indicators flash in phase at 3 to 5 Hz under heavy or urgent braking. The emergency stop signal is automatically activated if the vehicle speed is greater than 50 km/h (31 mph) and the emergency braking logic defined by regulation No. 13 (heavy vehicles), 13H (light vehicles), or 78 (motorcycles) is activated; the ESS may be displayed when a light vehicle's deceleration is greater than 6 m/s^{2} (20 ft/s^{2}) or a heavy vehicle's deceleration is greater than 4 m/s^{2} (13 ft/s^{2}), and the ESS must be discontinued once the vehicle's deceleration drops below 2.5 m/s^{2} (8.2 ft/s^{2}).

In February 2019, members of the European Parliament approved rules making emergency stop signals mandatory on new vehicles sold in the European Union.

Toyota, Mercedes-Benz, Volvo and BMW were among the earlier automakers to begin equipping vehicles with ESS. In 2013, Kia introduced the concept on some of their Australian-market models.

Other methods of severe braking indication have also been implemented; some Volvo models make the stop lights brighter, and some BMWs have "Adaptive Brake Lights" that effectively increase the size of the stop lights under severe braking by illuminating them at brighter-than-normal intensity. As long as the brighter-than-normal stop lights are within the regulated maximum intensity for stop lights in general, this kind of implementation does not require specific regulatory approval, since the stop lights continue to operate in accord with general stop light regulations.

The idea behind such emergency braking indicator systems is to catch following drivers' attention with increased urgency. However, there remains considerable debate over whether the system offers a measurable increase in safety. To date, studies of vehicles with ESS have not shown significant improvement. The systems used by BMW, Volvo, and Mercedes differ not only in operational mode (growing vs. intensifying vs. flashing, respectively), but also in such parameters as the deceleration threshold of activation. Data is being collected and analyzed in an effort to determine how such a system might be implemented to maximize a safety benefit, if such a benefit can be realized with visual emergency braking displays. An experimental study at the University of Toronto has tested stop lights which gradually and continuously grow in illuminated area with increasing braking.

The ESS is not expensive because it reuses existing warning and stop signals.

One potential problem with flashing stop lights in the United States and Canada is regulations that permit flashing stop lights to be used as rear turn signal and hazard lights, in lieu of separate dedicated lights.

==== Rear fog lights ====
ISO symbol for rear fog lights, UNECE 121 symbol

In Europe and other countries adhering to UN Regulation 48, vehicles must be equipped with one or two bright red "rear fog lamps", which serve as high-intensity rear position lights to be activated in poor visibility conditions to make the vehicle more visible from the rear. The allowable range of intensity for a rear fog light is 150 to 300 candela, within the range of a US stop light. Rear fog lights are not required equipment in the US, but they are permitted, and they are found almost exclusively on European-brand vehicles in North America. Audi, Jaguar, Mercedes-Benz, Mini, Land Rover, Porsche, Saab, and Volvo provide functional rear fog lights on their North American models. Some vehicles from non-European brands which are adaptions of European-market offerings, such as the first-generation Ford Transit Connect, have come standard with rear fog lights, or vehicles with European-market counterparts, such as the second generation Chrysler 300, have an option for them. The second generation Oldsmobile Aurora also had dual rear fog lights installed in the rear bumper as standard equipment.

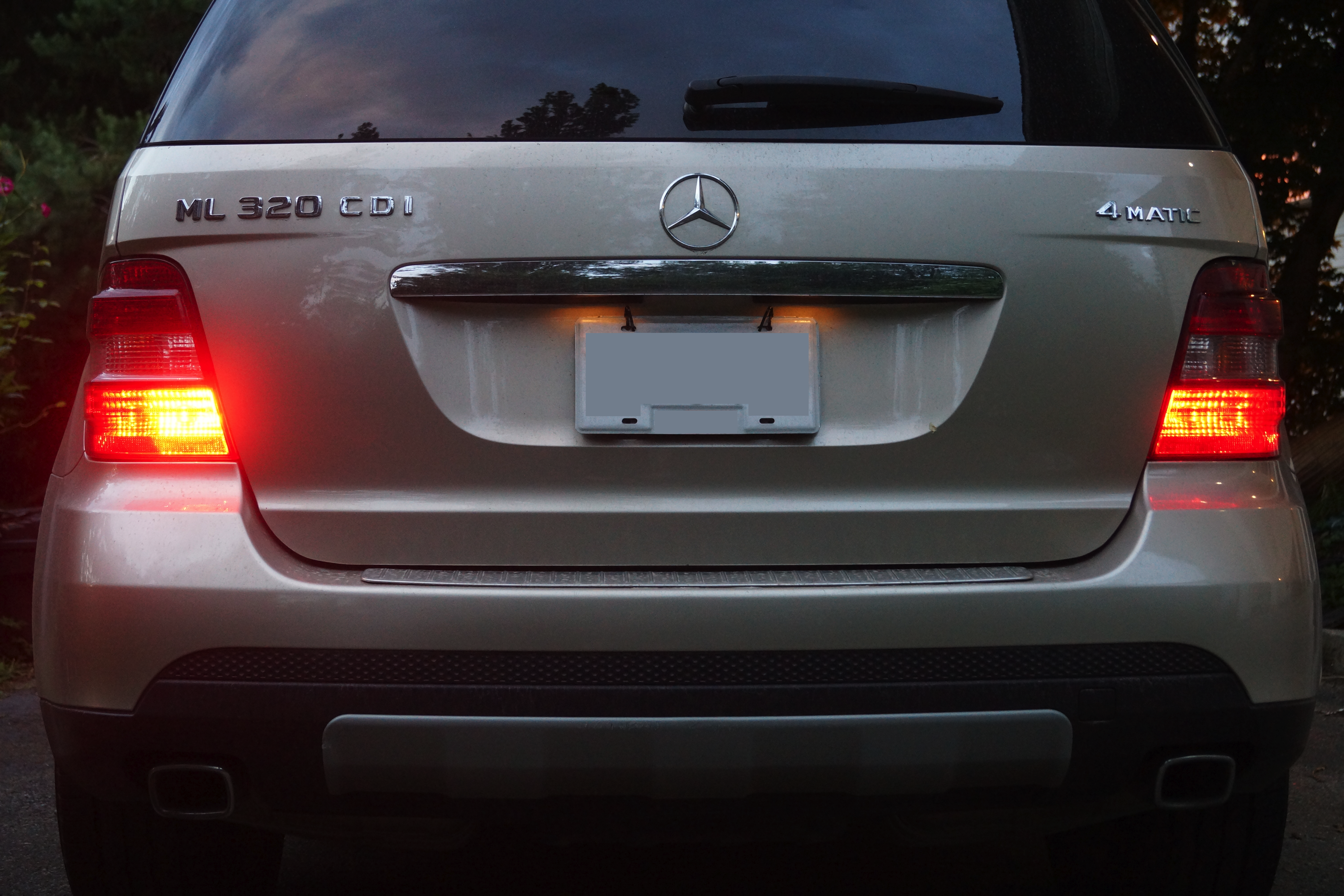
Single rear fog light on a Mercedes-Benz M-Class (W164)

Most jurisdictions permit rear fog lights to be installed either singly or in pairs. If a single rear fog is fitted, most jurisdictions require it to be located at or to the driver's side of the vehicle's centreline—whichever side is the prevailing driver's side in the country in which the vehicle is registered. This is to maximise the sight line of following drivers to the rear fog light. In many cases, a single reversing light is mounted on the passenger side of the vehicle, positionally symmetrical with the rear fog. If two rear fog lights are fitted, they must be symmetrical with respect to the vehicle's centreline. Proponents of twin rear fog lights say two lights provide vehicle distance information not available from a single light. Proponents of the single rear fog light say dual rear fog lights closely mimic the appearance of illuminated stop lights (which are mandatorily installed in pairs), reducing the conspicuity of the stop lights' message when the rear fogs are activated. To provide some safeguard against rear fog lights being confused with stop lights, UN Regulation 48 requires a separation of at least 10 cm between the closest illuminated edges of any stop light and any rear fog light.

==== Reversing (backup) lights ====
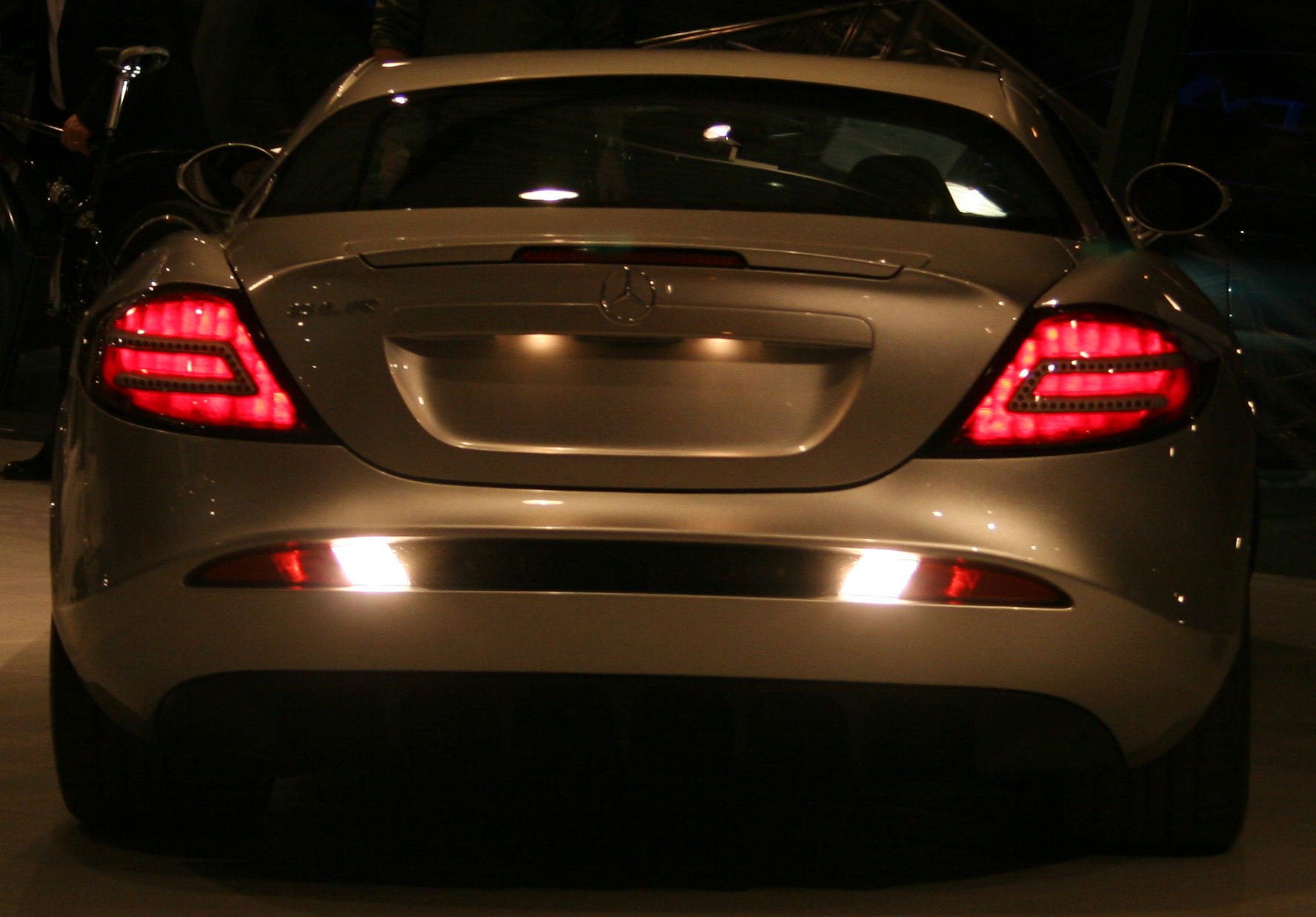
Lit reversing lights on a Mercedes-Benz SLR McLaren

To warn adjacent vehicle operators and pedestrians of a vehicle's rearward motion, and to provide illumination to the rear when reversing, each vehicle must be equipped with one or two rear-mounted, rear-facing reversing (or "backup") lights.

Reversing lights are required to produce white light by US and international UN regulations. However, some countries have at various times permitted amber reversing lights. In Australia and New Zealand, for example, vehicle manufacturers were faced with the task of localizing American cars originally equipped with combination red brake/turn signal lights and white reversing lights. Those countries' regulations permitted the amber rear turn signals to light up steadily as reversing lights, so automakers and importers were able to combine the (mandatorily amber) rear turn signal and (optionally amber) reversing light function, and so comply with the regulations without the need for additional lighting devices. Both countries now require white reversing lights, and the combination amber turn/reverse light is no longer permitted on new vehicles. The US state of Washington currently permits reversing lights to emit white or amber light.

Some car models, such as some Saabs have white reversing lights in the front turn indicators that switch on with the rear reversing lights.

==== Rear registration plate light ====
The rear registration plate is illuminated either by a single or a pair of yellow or white light(s), affixed within the indentation of the trunk or bumper. It is designed to light the surface of the plate without creating light directly visible to the rear of the vehicle, and must be illuminated whenever the position lights are lit.

=== On large vehicles ===
Large vehicles such as trucks and buses are in many cases required to carry additional lighting devices beyond those required on passenger vehicles. The specific requirements vary according to the regulations in force where the vehicle is registered.

==== Identification lights ====
In the US and Canada, vehicles over 80 inches (2.032 m) wide must be equipped with three amber front and three red rear identification lights spaced 6–12 inches (15–30 cm) apart at the centre of the front and rear of the vehicle, as high as practicable. The front identification lights are typically mounted atop the cab of the vehicle. The purpose of these lights is to alert other drivers to the presence of a wide (and usually tall) vehicle.

==== End-outline marker lights ====
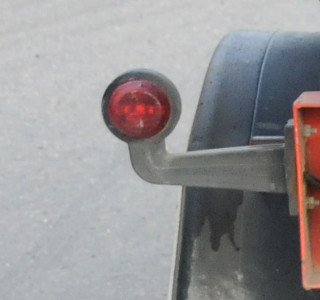
End outline marker light

UN Regulation 48 requires vehicles exceeding 2.10 metres (83 in) in width to be equipped with white front and red rear end-outline marker lights on both the left and right, which, like North American identification lights, are intended to indicate a vehicle's overall width and height. The front clearance lights may be amber in Australia and New Zealand.

==== Intermediate side marker lights and reflectors ====
US and Canadian regulations require large vehicles to be equipped with amber side marker lights and reflectors mounted midway between the front and rear side markers. Australian Design Rule 45/01 provides for side marker lights on trucks and other large vehicles producing amber light to the front and red to the rear with no requirement to emit light to the side.

==== Rear overtake lights ====
Until about the 1970s in France, Spain, Morocco, and possibly other countries, many commercial vehicles and some Soviet Sovtransavto road trains had a green light mounted on the rear offside. This could be operated by the driver to indicate that it was safe for the following vehicle to overtake.

=== Emergency warning devices ===
==== Hazard warning signal ====
ISO symbol for hazard warning signal, UNECE 121 symbol

The hazard warning signal (sometimes called "hazard warning flashers", "hazard warning lights", "emergency lights", "4-way flashers", "hazards", or "flashers") is provided by flashing all of a vehicle's left and right turn signals simultaneously and in phase. Hazard warning signals first appeared as aftermarket accessories in the early 1950s; by the late 1960s, regulations around the world came to require all new vehicles to be so equipped. Operation of the warning signals must be from a control independent of the turn signal control, and an audiovisual tell-tale must be provided to the driver. In most vehicles, the hazard warning signals can be switched on and off with a physical push-button, which is typically marked with a triangular symbol, symbolizing a warning triangle.

This function is meant to indicate a hazard such as a vehicle stopped in or near moving traffic, a disabled vehicle, a vehicle moving substantially slower than the flow of traffic such as a truck climbing a steep grade, the presence of stopped or slow traffic ahead on a high-speed road and/or the presence of stopped or slow traffic ahead on unpredictable natural disasters like earthquakes, floods, landslides.

In vehicles with separate left and right green turn signal tell-tale on the dashboard, both left and right indicators may flash to provide a visual indication of the hazard flashers' operation. In vehicles with a single green turn signal tell-tale on the dashboard, a separate red tell-tale must be provided for hazard flasher indication. Because the hazard flasher function operates the vehicle's left and right turn signals, a left or a right turn signal function may not be provided while the hazard flashers are operating.

Apart from its use as emergency lighting, a single flash of the hazard lights is used to show gratitude to yielding drivers in several countries. However, in the United Kingdom, they must not be used except to warn others of either a temporary obstruction when the vehicle is stationary or a hazard ahead on a dual carriageway with a speed limit of at least 50 mph.

=== Retroreflectors ===
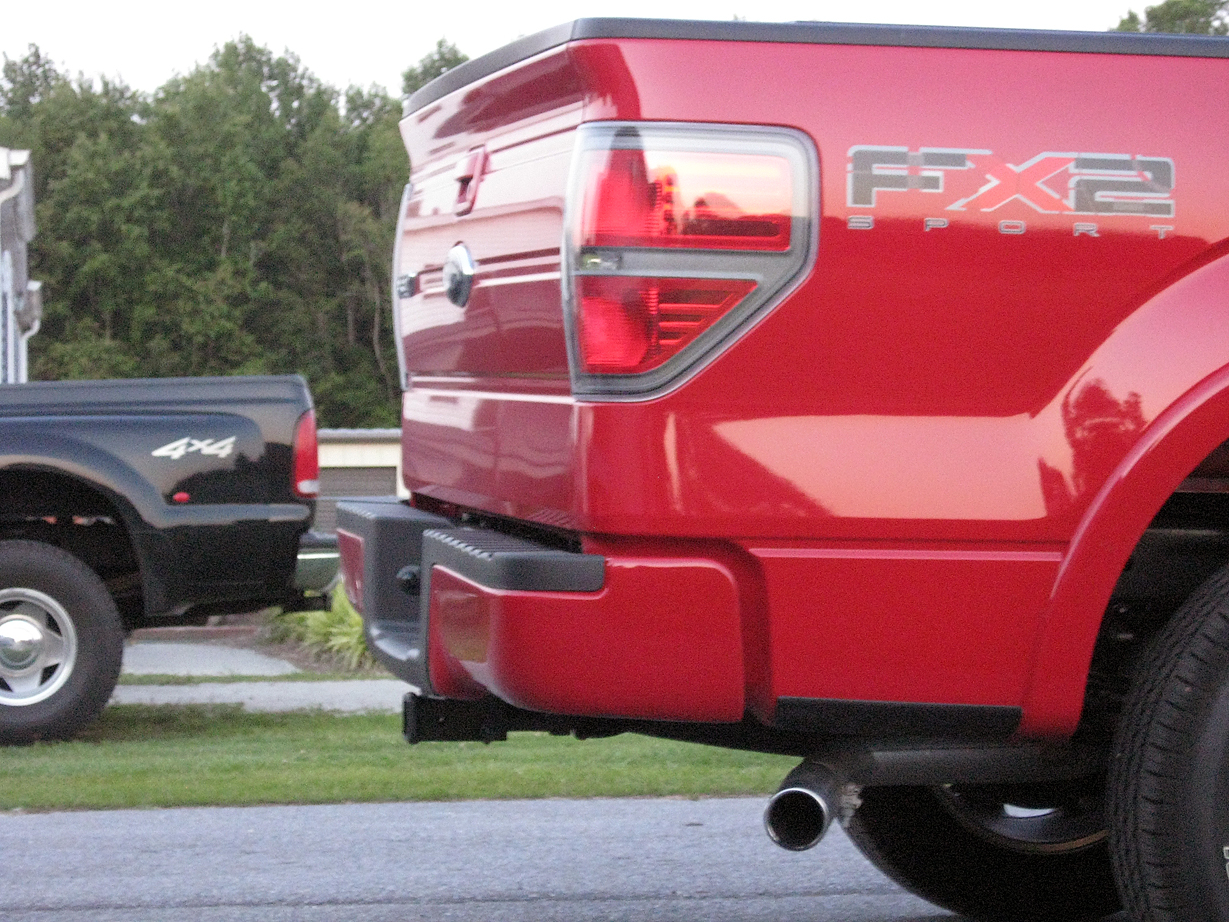
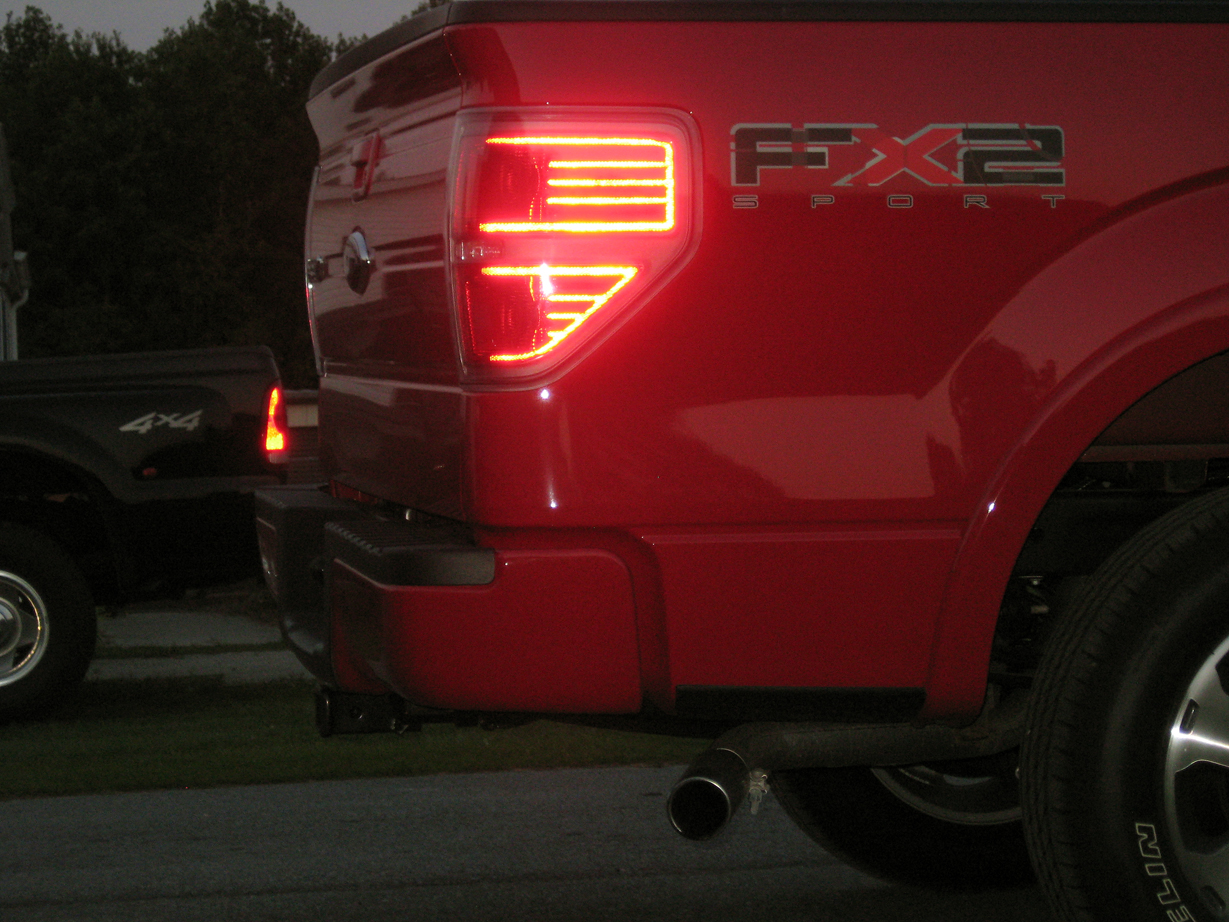
Red rear side marker retroreflectors on Ford F-series trucks without (top) and with (bottom) direct illumination

"Retroreflectors" (also called "reflex reflectors") produce no light of their own, but rather reflect incident light towards its source, such as another driver's headlights. They are regulated as automotive lighting devices, and specified to account for the separation between a vehicle's headlights and its driver's eyes. Thus, vehicles can remain conspicuous even with their lights off. Regulations worldwide require all vehicles and trailers to be equipped with rear-facing red retroreflectors; in countries where UN Regulation No. 48 is applied, these must be triangular on trailers and non-triangular on vehicles other than trailers. Since 1968, US regulations also require side-facing retroreflectors, amber in front and red in the rear. Sweden, South Africa, and other countries have at various times required white front-facing retroreflectors.

=== Variable-intensity signal lights ===
International UN Regulations explicitly permit vehicle signal lights with intensity automatically increased during bright daylight hours when sunlight reduces the effectiveness of the stop lights, and automatically decreased during hours of darkness when glare could be a concern. Regulations in the US and by the UN contain provisions for determining the minimum and maximum acceptable intensity for lights that contain more than a single light source.

=== Experimental systems ===
==== Multicolour auxiliary signals ====
Some jurisdictions, such as the US states of Washington, Oregon and Idaho, permit vehicles to be equipped with auxiliary rear signal systems displaying a green light when the accelerator is depressed, yellow light when the vehicle is coasting, and red light when the brake is depressed. Such systems have in the past been sold as aftermarket accessories, but are today seldom seen in traffic.

==== Front brake lights ====
Since the late 1960s, there have been proposals to introduce a front-mounted brake light, where green or blue lights would indicate to pedestrians at crossings that an approaching vehicle is slowing down. A small subjective survey was undertaken in the US in 1971.

In 2014, the idea was suggested by Slovak Lubomír Marjak (of manufacturing company Lumaco, which makes front brake lights) to German EU parliamentarian Dieter-Lebrecht Koch. Field tests were done in Germany in 2017, as well as in Slovakia in 2022 and 2023. More tests are planned in Italy. Expert analysts have found severe flaws in these tests and the accompanying safety claims.

Front brake lights were demonstrated in concept cars including the 1967 Explorer IV and the and 1969 Explorer V designed by Rohm & Haas to showcase the potential applications for their plexiglas material, as well as in the GFG Style Sibylla GG80 designed by Giorgetto Giugiaro and shown at the Mondial Paris Motor Show in 2018. The only production car to feature a built-in front brake light (as of 2023) was the Bricklin SV-1 of 1974.

=== Research and development ===
The US National Highway Traffic Safety Administration, among other bodies, has commissioned studies of vehicle signal systems and configurations to determine the most promising avenues and best practices for enhanced crash avoidance via optimized vehicle conspicuity and signal lighting systems.

== Interior and convenience lights ==
Most cars have at least one "dome light" (or "courtesy light") located in or near the ceiling of the passenger compartment, to provide illumination by which to fasten seatbelts and enter or exit the car. These often have an option to automatically switch on when the front (or any) passenger doors are opened. Many vehicles have expanded this feature, causing the overhead interior light to remain on after all doors are closed, allowing passengers to fasten seat belts with added illumination. The extended lighting cycle usually ends when the vehicle's ignition has begun, or a gradual reduction in light emitted after a couple of minutes if the car is not started, called "theater" lighting. Interior lighting has been added on some vehicles at the bottom edge of the dashboard, illuminating the floor for front passengers, or underneath the front seats at the rear, illuminating the floor for rear passengers. This type of convenience lighting approach is also sometimes used to illuminate interior or exterior door handles, exterior step running boards, or electric window switches.

LED light sources appear increasingly as interior convenience lights in various locations, especially with finely focused lighting on console control surfaces and in cabin storage areas.

Map lights are aimed at specific passenger positions and allow for reading without glare distraction to the driver. Some vehicles have "approach lighting" or "puddle lights" (lights that illuminate the ground outside the doors) in the exterior mirrors or lower edges of the doors, as well as interior lighting activated via key fob. Many cars have lights in the trunk, the engine compartment, the glove box, and other storage compartments. Modern pickup trucks usually have one or more white cargo lights that illuminate the bed of the truck, often controlled in conjunction with the interior dome lighting.

Most gauges and controls on a dashboard in modern vehicles are illuminated when the headlights are turned on, and the intensity of light can be adjusted by the driver for comfort. Saab automobiles, for example, have an aircraft-style "night panel" function that shuts off all interior illumination save for the speedometer (unless attention is called to a critical situation on another gauge) to improve the driver's night vision.

== On service vehicles ==
=== Emergency vehicle lights ===
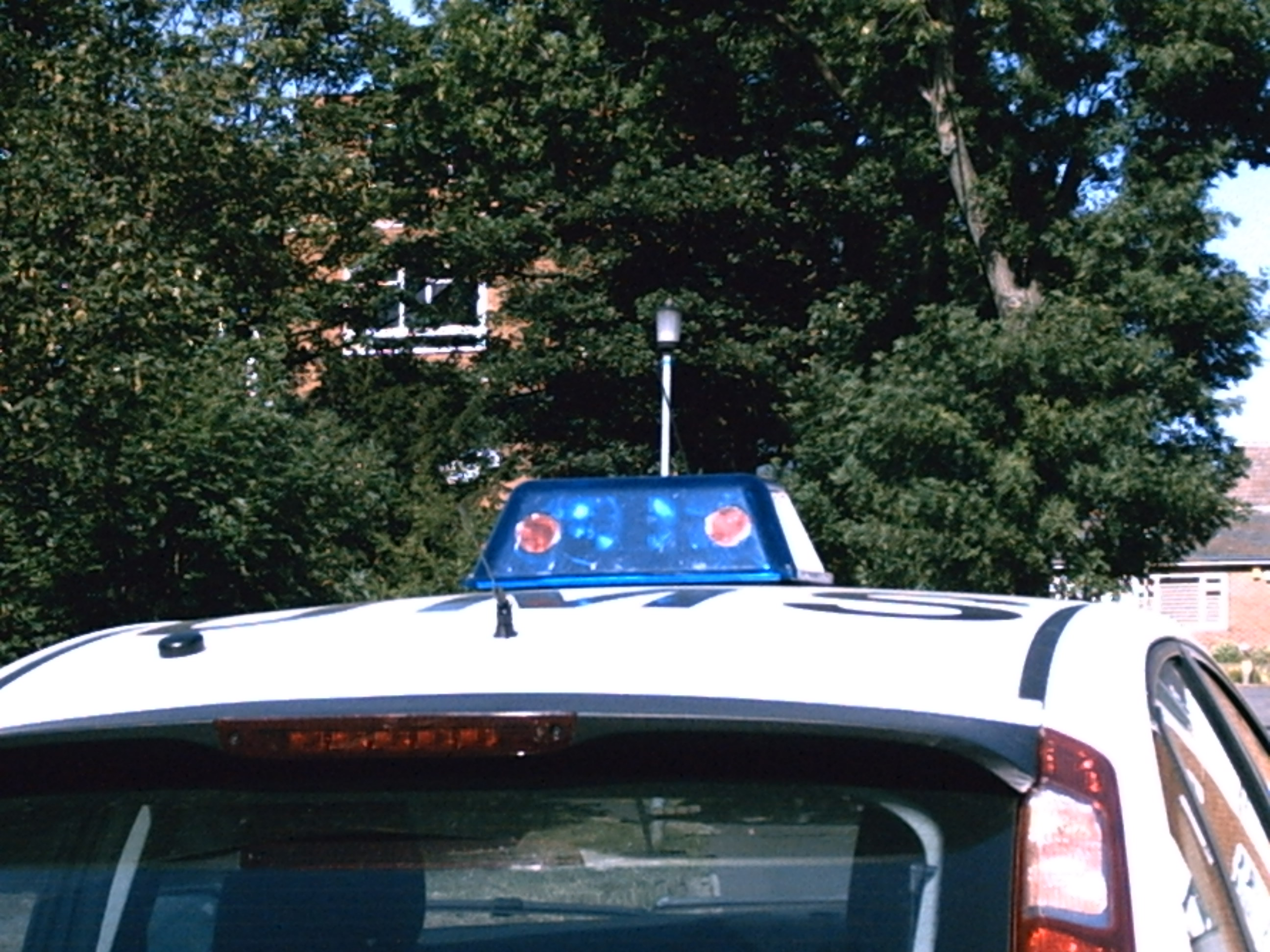
Light bar on a British police car

Emergency vehicles such as fire engines, ambulances, police cars, snow-removal vehicles and tow trucks are usually equipped with intense warning lights of particular colours. These may be motorised rotating beacons, xenon strobes, or arrays of LEDs.

The prescribed colours differ by jurisdiction; in most countries, blue and red special warning lights are used on police, fire, and medical-emergency vehicles. In the United States and some other jurisdictions, amber lights are for tow trucks, private security personnel, construction vehicles, and other nonofficial special-service vehicles, while volunteer firefighters use red, blue, or green, depending on jurisdiction. In the US it is a violation of the DOT (Department of Transportation) Uniform Vehicle Code for any non-emergency vehicle (Police/Fire/Ambulance) to operate forward-facing red lights of any kind. Cars in the US only have red tail lights, and no blue lights; a vehicle displaying a red (forward-facing) light (flashing or not) coming towards a driver, or from behind the driver (in rearview mirror) indicates that an official emergency vehicle is coming, requiring the driver to yield, pull off to the side of the road, or otherwise get out of its way. Some US states allow emergency vehicles to have blue lights that can be turned on to warn drivers of an emergency vehicle in action; blue and red lights can be combined, forward- and/or rear-facing. In the UK, doctors may use green warning lights; although these do not allow the user to claim any exemption from road traffic regulations (compared to the blue lights used by statutory emergency services when responding to calls). Special warning lights, usually amber, are also sometimes mounted on slow or wide vehicles such as mobile cranes, excavators, tractors, and even mobility scooters in certain conditions.

=== Taxi displays ===
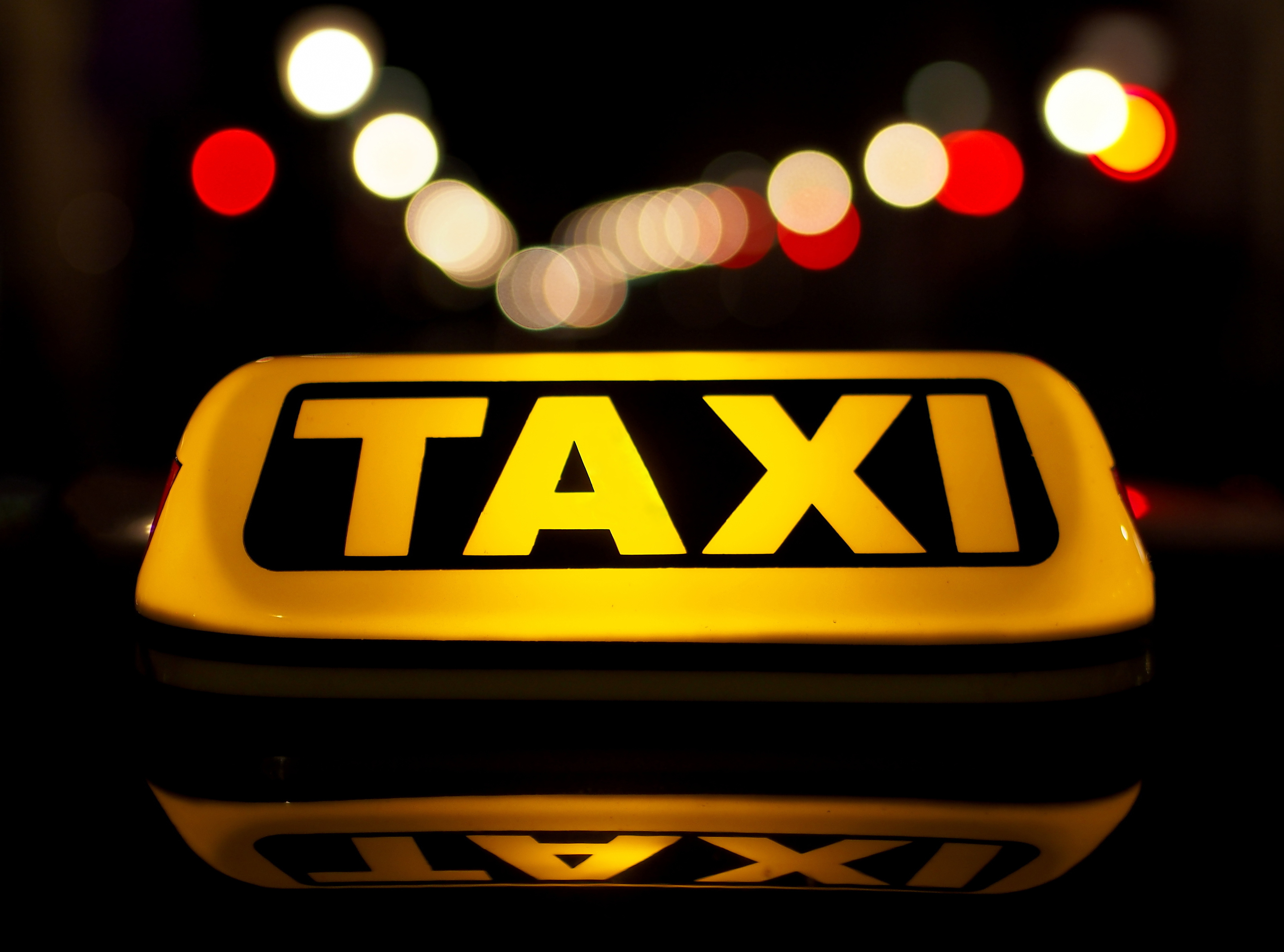
An illuminated taxi sign

Standard taxicabs for street hire are distinguished by special lights affixed to the vehicle's roof in accordance with local regulations.

They may have an illuminated "Taxi" sign, a light to signal that they are ready to take passengers, or off duty, or an emergency panic light the driver can activate in the event of a robbery to alert passersby to call the police. Depending on local regulations, the "Taxi" sign may also be required to display a number identifying the vehicle.

== Light sources ==
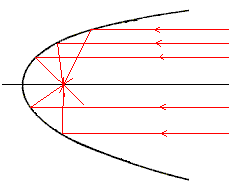
Light source placed in a parabolic reflector to achieve a directed beam

=== Incandescent lights ===
The incandescent light bulb was for a long time the only light source used in automotive lighting. Incandescent bulbs are still commonly used in turn signals to stop hyper-flashing of the turn signal flashers. Many types of bulbs have been used. Standardized type numbers are used by manufacturers to identify bulbs with the same specifications. Bases may be bayonet-type with one or two contacts, plastic or glass wedges, or dual wire loops or ferrules used on tubular "festoon" lights. Screw-base lights are never used in automobile applications due to their loosening under vibration. Signal lights with internal or external coloured lenses use colourless bulbs; conversely, lights with colourless lenses may use red or amber bulbs to provide light of the required colours for the various functions.

Typically, bulbs of 21 to 27 watts producing 280 to 570 lumens (22 to 45 mean spherical candlepower) are used for stop, turn, reversing and rear fog lights, while bulbs of 4 to 10 W, producing 40 to 130 lm (3 to 10 mscp) are used for tail lights, parking lights, side marker lights and side turn signal repeaters.

Tungsten-halogen lights are a very common light source for headlights and other forward illumination functions. Some recent vehicles use small halogen bulbs for exterior signalling and marking functions, as well. The first halogen light approved for automotive use was the H1, which used 55 watts producing 1500 lumens and was introduced in Europe in 1962.

=== Light-emitting diodes (LED) ===
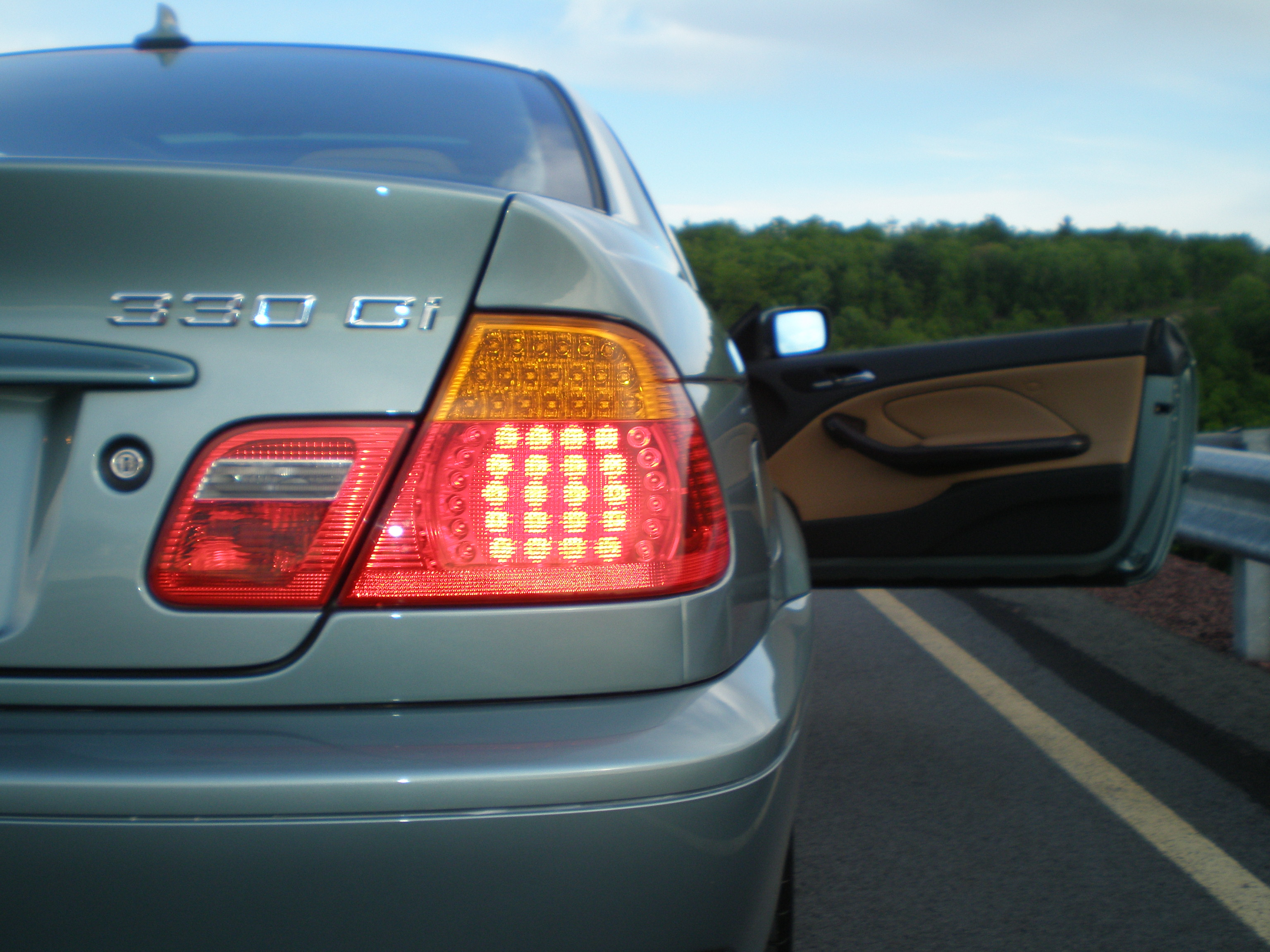
Light-emitting diode (LED) tail lights of a BMW 330Ci

Since 1993, light-emitting diodes (LEDs) have increasingly been used in automotive lighting. They offer a very long service life, extreme vibration resistance, high colour durability, high efficiency (lumen/Watt) and can benefit from considerably more compact packaging compared to most bulb-type assemblies. LEDs also offer a potential safety benefit when employed in stop lights; when power is applied, they rise to full intensity approximately 250 milliseconds (¼ second) faster than incandescent bulbs. This effectively instant rise time theoretically provides following drivers more time to react to the stop light signal, but has not been shown to make cars with LED stop lights less likely to be struck from behind.

LEDs were first applied to automotive lighting in centre high-mount stop lamps (CHMSLs), beginning with the 1986 Chevrolet Corvette (C4). Adoption of LEDs for other signal functions on passenger cars is gradually increasing with demand for the technology and related styling updates. The first car registered to drive on the road with full LED rear lights was Land Rover's LCV 2/3 concept car in the 1990s. At the time, the only light function that was difficult to reproduce was the reverse light, as white LEDs did not yet exist. The reverse function was only achievable with the introduction of blue LEDs; by mixing red, green and blue LEDs in a defined distributed pattern behind a lens, white light was produced that conformed to the legal requirements of a reverse light.

The Maserati 3200GT, introduced in 1999, was the first production car to use full LED taillights. In North America, the 2000 Cadillac Deville was the first passenger car with LED taillights. The 2002 Kia Opirus was an early adopter of LED front turn signals. The 2007 Audi R8 used two strips of optically focused high-intensity LEDs for its daytime running lights. Optional on the R8 outside North America were the world's first LED headlights, made by AL-Automotive Lighting. The low and high beams, along with the position (parking) light and front turn signal, all use LEDs. The Lexus LS 600h (XF40) features LED low beam, position and side marker lights in North America, and the 2009 Cadillac Escalade Platinum used LEDs for the low and high beams, as well as for the position and side marker lights. The Mercedes-Benz S-Class (W222) used entirely LED lights, even in the most basic trim level.

LED lights are used for flashing beacon lights on vehicles such as maintenance trucks. Previously, traditional light sources required the engine to continue running to ensure that the battery would not become depleted if the lights were to be used for more than a few hours. The energy-efficient nature of LEDs allows them to continue flashing with the engine off.

LED lighting systems are sensitive to heat. Due to the negative influences of heat on the stability of photometric performance and the light transmitting components, the importance of thermal design, stability tests, usage of low-UV-type LED modules and UV-resistance tests of internal materials has increased dramatically. For this reason, LED signal lights must remain compliant with the intensity requirements for the functions they produce after one minute and after thirty minutes of continuous operation. In addition, UN Regulation 112 contains a set of tests for LED modules, including colour rendering, UV radiation, and temperature stability tests. According to UN Regulations 112 and 123, mechanical, electromechanical or other devices for headlights must withstand endurance tests and function failure tests.

=== High intensity discharge (HID) ===
High-intensity discharge, or HID lights, sometimes referred to as "xenon lights", are modified metal halide lights employing xenon fill gas. Traditional HID lights, such as those used for general lighting, have a long warm-up time. Headlights must provide light very shortly after they are turned on, and the xenon gas serves to reduce warm-up time.

=== Neon tubes ===
Neon light tubes were introduced into series production for the centre high-mount stop light on the 1995 Ford Explorer. Notable later uses included the 1998 Lincoln Mark VIII with a neon tube spanning the width of the trunk decklid, and the BMW Z8, which made extensive use of neon.

Neon lights offer the same nearly instant rise time as LEDs, but require a high-voltage ballast.

== Self driving ==
In December 2023, Mercedes-Benz received approval in California and Nevada, the only states where it is legal to operate their self-driving vehicles, for turquoise lights in accordance with SAE standard J3134, to indicate to outside observers that the car's self-driving system is engaged. Mercedes is the first car manufacturer to equip their self-driving vehicles with such lights.

== Distributive lighting ==
In distributive light systems, the light from a single source is sent via optical fibres or light guides to wherever it is needed in the automobile. Light guides are commonly used to distributively light dashboard displays, and premium vehicles are beginning to use distributive systems for lighting such items as door locks, window controls, and cup holders. Distributive exterior lighting has also been explored, with high-intensity central light sources.

== See also ==
- Automotive lamp types
- Bicycle lighting (laws and recommendations can be similar to automotive specifications)
- Blackout light
- Headlamp
- Hidden headlamps
- Lighting-up time
- National Highway Traffic Safety Administration (NHTSA)
- Navigation light
- Train lights
- Twilight Sentinel
- World Forum for Harmonization of Vehicle Regulations
