= Federal Motor Vehicle Safety Standard 108 =

Federal Motor Vehicle Safety Standard

Federal Motor Vehicle Safety Standard 108 (FMVSS 108) regulates all automotive lighting, signalling and reflective devices in the United States. Like all other Federal Motor Vehicle Safety Standards, FMVSS 108 is administered by the United States Department of Transportation's National Highway Traffic Safety Administration.

== Evolution ==
FMVSS 108 is codified in Title 49 of the Code of Federal Regulations Part 571, Section 108. The most recent version was published by NHTSA for comment in December 2007, and since then, it has been amended in April 2011, August 2011, January 2012, December 2012, December 2015, February 2016, and February 2022.

When it was initially published in 1968, Motor Vehicle Safety Standard No. 108 was part of 49 CFR 371.21, incorporating several SAE recommended practices by reference. The 1969 version of FMVSS 108 allowed the use of two headlamps, each 7 in (180 mm) in diameter, or four smaller 5 3/4 in (150 mm) headlamps.

=== 2022 Amendment ===
In February 2022, FMVSS 108 was amended to allow automakers to install adaptive driver beam (ADB) headlamps on new vehicles. However, carmakers have not implemented ADB because of contradictions in the rule.

As of December 2024, FMVSS 108 has not been updated to adapt to widespread use of LED headlamps, which are criticized for being too bright and blinding other drivers. Some manufacturers have reportedly engineered headlamps to have a dark spot where they are measured according to the regulation while being over-illuminated in the rest of the field.

== Usage outside of United States ==
=== Canada ===
Canada's analogous regulation is called Canada Motor Vehicle Safety Standard 108 (CMVSS 108), and is very similar to FMVSS 108. The primary difference is:

- CMVSS 108 requires daytime running lamps on all vehicles made since 1 January 1990, while FMVSS 108 permits but does not require DRLs

Both standards differ markedly from the UN (formerly "European") standards used in most other countries worldwide, not only in technical provisions, terminology, and requirements, but also in format: each European standard deals with only one type of lighting device, while the single U.S. and Canadian standards regulate all lighting and reflective devices.

=== New Zealand ===
Retroreflective material fitted to a heavy motor vehicle in New Zealand manufactured on or after 1st Jan 2006 must comply with either UNECE Regulation 104 or FMVSS 108.

== Certification ==
It is the responsibility of a manufacturer of vehicles and/or vehicle lamps to certify that each motor vehicle and/or lamp is in full compliance with the minimum performance requirements of FMVSS 108. This is a self-certification process as opposed to the type approval process which is used in other lighting regulations such as UNECE Regulation 48.

In order to show compliance to FMVSS 108, the lens of each original equipment and replacement headlamp, daytime running lamp (DRL) and certain conspicuity reflectors must be marked with the symbol "DOT". This symbol may also be applied to compliant signal lighting devices, but is not mandatory.

== See also ==
- Automotive lighting
- Headlamp
- World Forum for Harmonization of Vehicle Regulations
- Motorcycle headlamp modulator
- FMVSS
