= Selective yellow =

Colour for automotive lamps

Selective yellow (approximation)

Colour coordinates
- Hex triplet: #FFBA00
- sRGB^{B} (r, g, b): (255, 186, 0)
- HSV (h, s, v): (44°, 100%, 100%)
- CIELCh_{uv} (L, C, h): (80, 100, 55°)
- Source: CIECD
- ISCC–NBS descriptor: Strong orange yellow
- B: Normalized to [0–255] (byte)

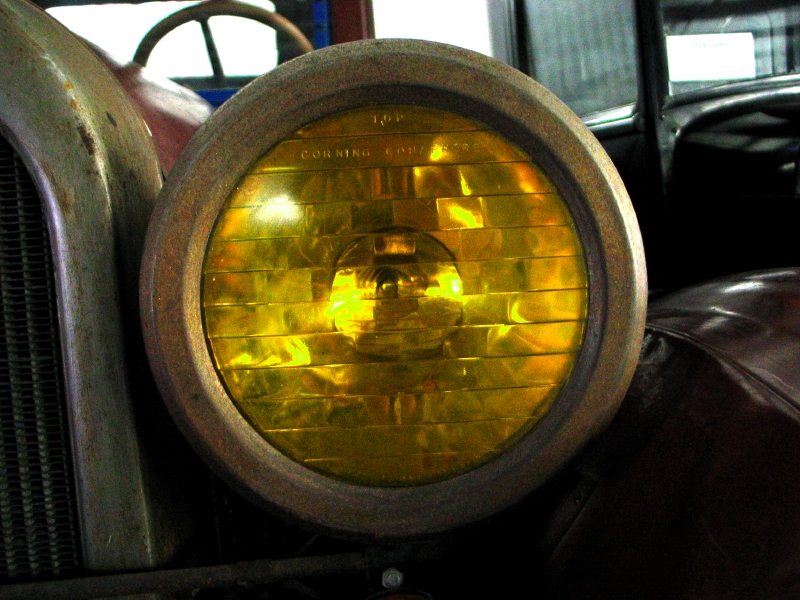
One of the first optic headlamp lenses, the Corning Conaphore made of selective yellow "Noviol" glass.

Selective yellow is a colour for automotive lamps, particularly headlamps and other road-illumination lamps, such as fog lamps. Under ECE regulations, headlamps were formerly permitted to be either white or selective yellow—in France, selective yellow was mandatory for all vehicles' road-illumination lamps until 1993.

== Color ==
Both the internationalized European ECE Regulation 19 and North American SAE standard J583 permit selective yellow front fog lamps. Meanwhile, ECE Regulation 48 (enforced 08 October 2016) requires new vehicles to be equipped with headlamps emitting white light. However, selective yellow headlamps remain permitted throughout Europe on vehicles already so equipped, as well as in non-European locales, such as Japan and New Zealand.

The intent of selective yellow is to improve vision by removing short, blue to violet wavelengths from the projected light. These wavelengths are difficult for the human visual system to process properly, and they cause perceived dazzle and glare effects in rain, fog and snow. Removing the blue-violet portion of a lamp's output to obtain selective yellow light can entail filter losses of around 15%, though the effect of this reduction is said to be mitigated or countervailed by the increased visual acuity available with yellow rather than white light in bad weather.

A research experiment done in the UK in 1968 using tungsten (non-halogen) lamps found that visual acuity is about 3% better with selective yellow headlamps than with white ones of equal intensity. Research done in the Netherlands in 1976 concluded that yellow and white headlamps are equivalent as regards traffic safety, though yellow light causes less discomfort glare than white light. Researchers note that tungsten filament lamps emit only a small amount of the blue light blocked by a selective-yellow filter, so such filtration makes only a small difference in the characteristics of the light output, and suggest that headlamps using newer kinds of sources such as metal halide (HID) bulbs may, through filtration, give off less visually distracting light while still having greater light output than halogen ones.

== Formal definition ==
The UNECE Regulations formally define selective yellow in terms of the CIE 1931 colour space as follows:

Limit towards red	$y \ge 0.138 + 0.580 x$
Limit towards green	$y \le 1.290 x - 0.100$
Limit towards white	$y \ge 0.966 - x$
Limit towards spectral value	$y \le 0.992 - x$

For front fog lamps, the limit towards white is extended:

Limit towards white	$y \ge 0.940 - x$
Limit towards white	$y \ge 0.440$

The entirety of the basic selective yellow definition lies outside the gamut of the sRGB colour space—such a pure yellow cannot be represented using RGB primaries. The colour swatch above is a desaturated approximation, created by taking the centroid of the standard selective yellow definition at (0.502, 0.477) and moving it towards the D65 white point, until it meets the sRGB gamut triangle at (0.478, 0.458).

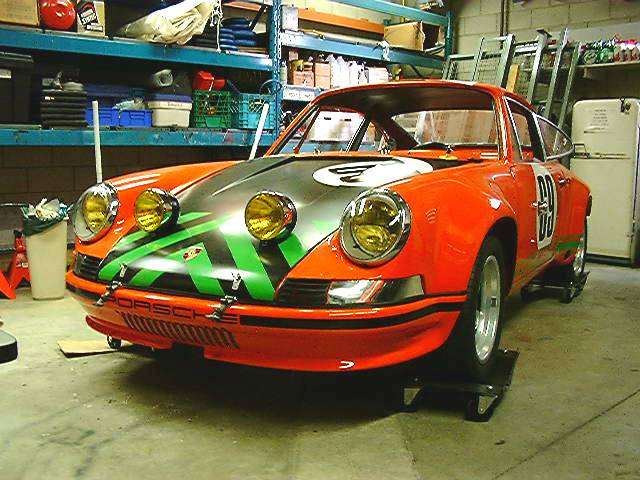
Porsche 911 with selective yellow lights

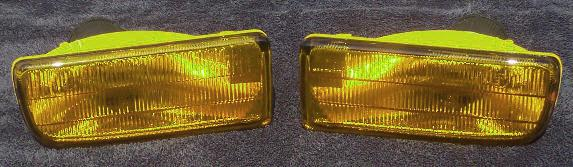
Selective yellow foglights

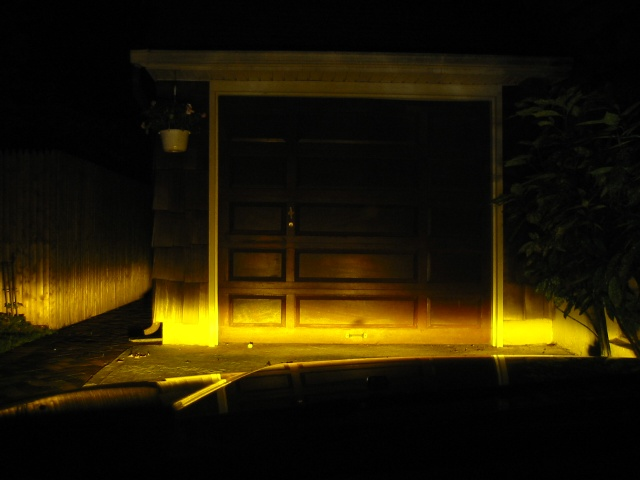
The beam produced by selective yellow lights
