= Volkswagen T-Roc =

Subcompact crossover SUV

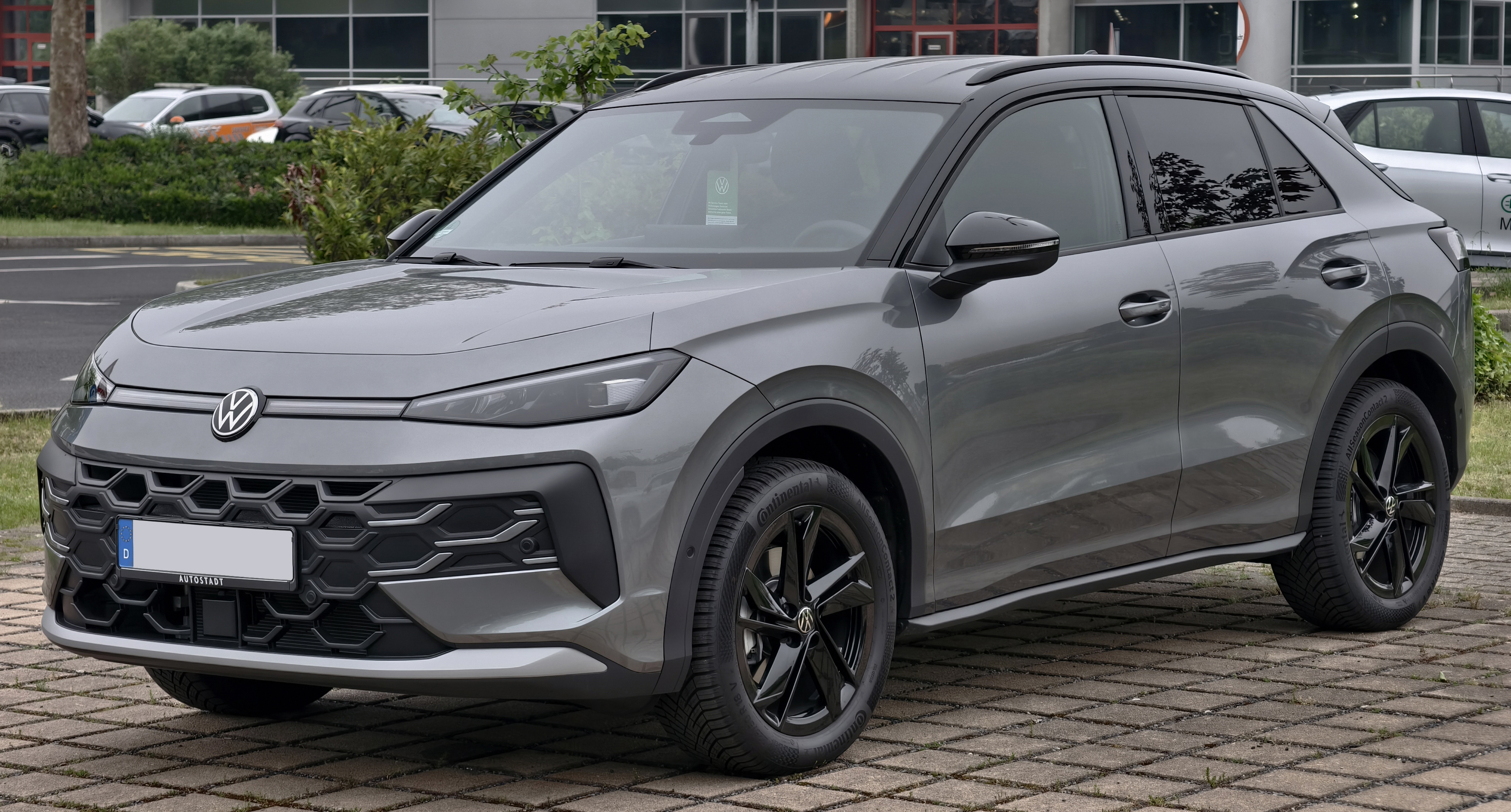
- 2026 T-Roc Style

Overview
- Manufacturer: Volkswagen
- Production: 2017–present

Body and chassis
- Class: Subcompact crossover SUV

The Volkswagen T-Roc is a subcompact crossover SUV manufactured by German automaker Volkswagen. It was unveiled at the 2017 Frankfurt Motor Show, and launched in November 2017. It is based on the Volkswagen Group MQB A1 platform, and generally has been considered as the SUV equivalent of the C-segment Golf. It is positioned between the Tiguan and the slightly smaller T-Cross, while being approximately the same size as the less expensive Taigo.

== First generation (2017) ==
First generation
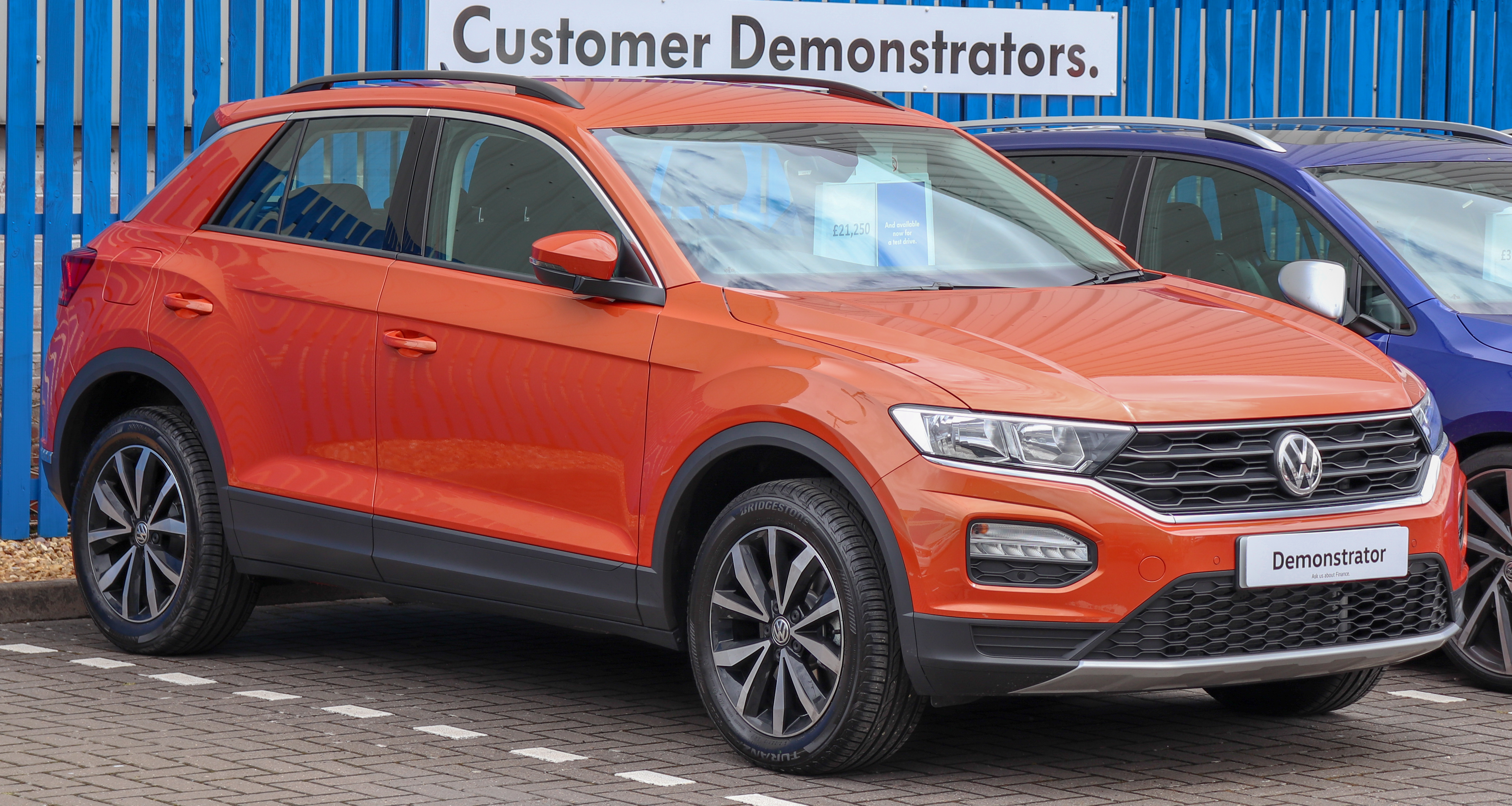

Overview
- Model code: A11/D11; AC7/AC8 (cabriolet)
- Production: November 2017 – November 2025 (SUV); November 2017 – 2027 (cabriolet)
- Assembly: Portugal: Palmela (Autoeuropa); China: Foshan, Guangdong (FAW-VW); Germany: Osnabrück (VW Osnabrück; cabriolet only)
- Designer: Marco Giumentaro, Ákos Száz

Body and chassis
- Body style: 5-door SUV; 2-door convertible SUV
- Layout: Front-engine, front-wheel-drive Front-engine, all-wheel-drive (4Motion)
- Platform: Volkswagen Group MQB A1
- Related: Volkswagen Golf Mk7; Volkswagen Taos/Tharu; SEAT Ateca; SEAT León Mk3; Jetta VS5; Škoda Karoq; Škoda Octavia Mk3; Audi Q2; Audi A3 Mk3

Powertrain
- Engine: Petrol: 1.0 L TSI 115 I3; 1.2 L TSI 115 I4; 1.4 L TSI 130 I4; 1.4 L TSI 150 I4; 1.5 L TSI 150 I4; 1.5 L TSI 160 I4（China）; 2.0 L TSI 190 I4; 2.0 L TSI 300 I4 (for T-Roc R only); Diesel: 1.6 L TDI 115 I4; 2.0 L TDI 150 I4
- Transmission: 5-speed manual 6-speed manual 7-speed DSG

Dimensions
- Wheelbase: 2,590 mm (102.0 in); 2,630 mm (103.5 in) (cabriolet); 2,680 mm (105.5 in) (China)
- Length: 4,234 mm (166.7 in); 4,268 mm (168.0 in) (cabriolet); 4,318–4,326 mm (170.0–170.3 in) (China)
- Width: 1,819 mm (71.6 in)
- Height: 1,573 mm (61.9 in); 1,522 mm (59.9 in) (cabriolet); 1,582 mm (62.3 in) (China)
- Curb weight: 1,270–1,555 kg (2,800–3,428 lb)

Chronology
- Predecessor: For convertible: Volkswagen Eos; Volkswagen Golf Cabriolet (Mk6); Volkswagen Beetle convertible

The T-Roc was previewed as a concept car with the same name at the 2014 Geneva Motor Show. It features an all-wheel drive drivetrain.

The production version of the T-Roc for the European market was launched in Italy on 23 August 2017 as Volkswagen's fourth SUV in the European market. The T-Roc is based on the MQB A1 platform and is closely related with the Volkswagen Golf Mk7, SEAT León Mk3, Audi A3 Mk3, and the Škoda Octavia Mk3. It is equipped with a MacPherson strut front suspension and, depending on the engine and drive system, either a torsion beam or multi-link rear suspension in combination with optional adaptive dampers.

European market units are assembled at Volkswagen Autoeuropa plant in Palmela, Setúbal, Portugal. Chinese market cars are assembled by FAW-Volkswagen joint-venture plant in Foshan, Guangdong.

The T-Roc was showcased in India at the 2020 Auto Expo, and was launched in the country as a limited imported model in March 2020.

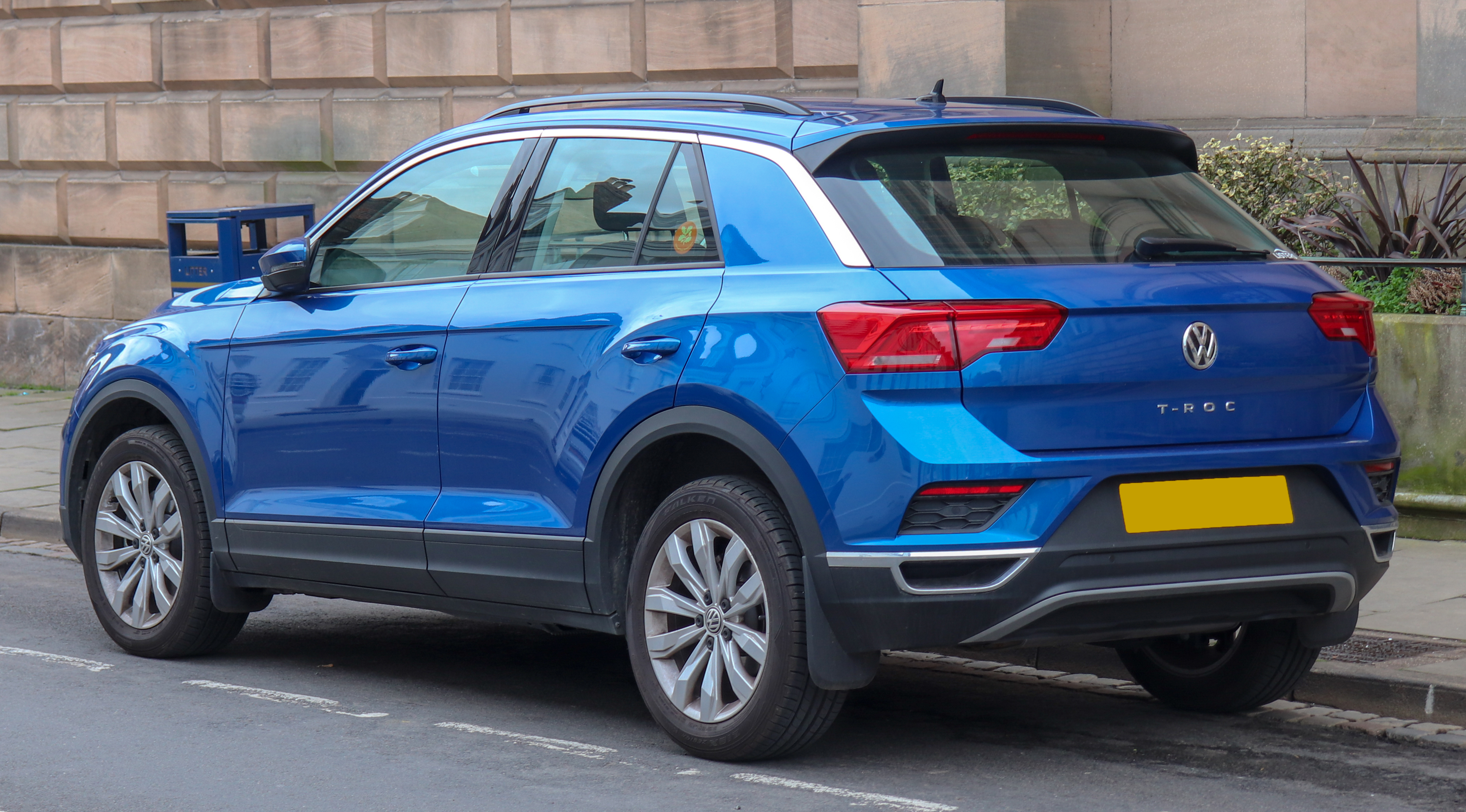
Rear view

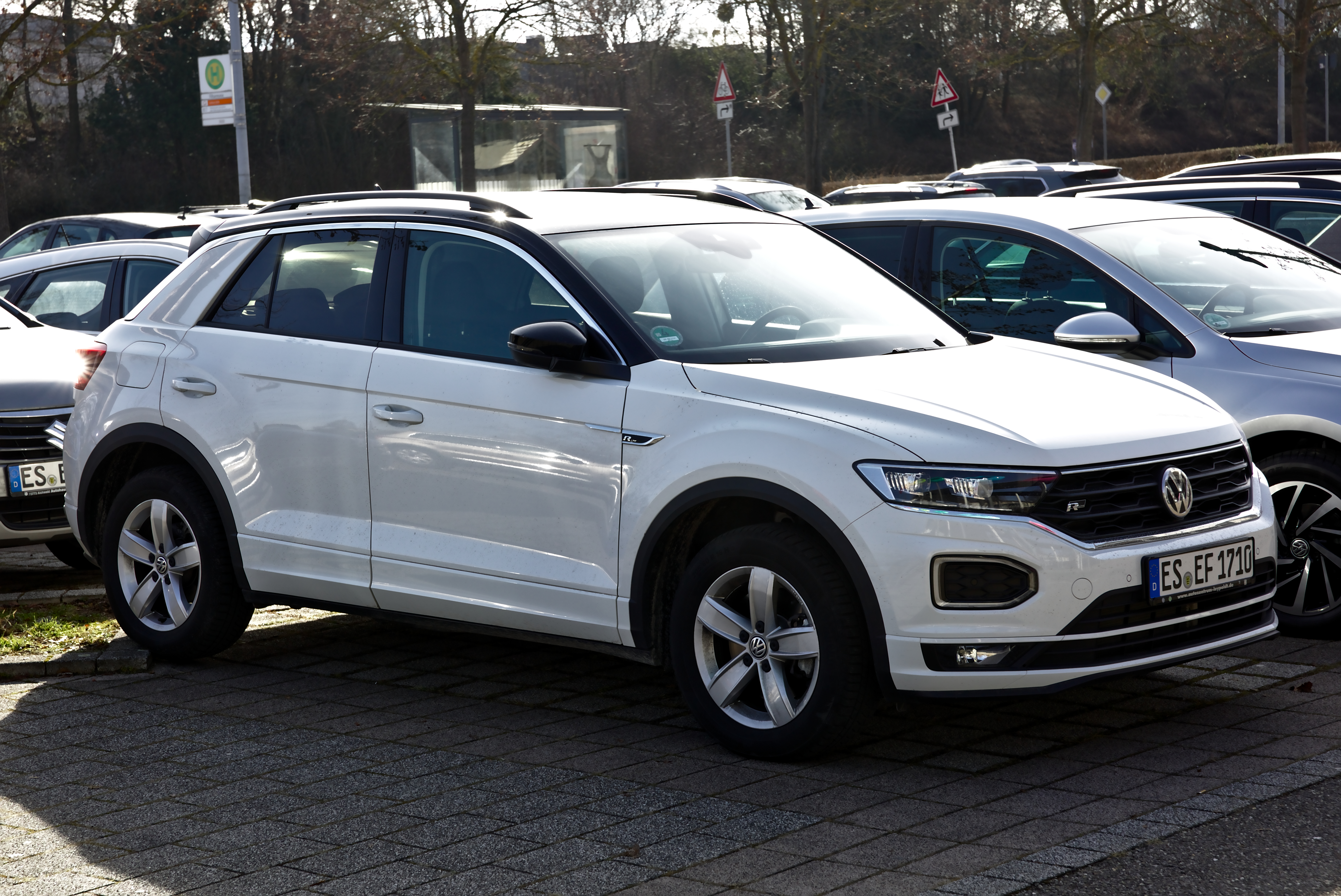
Volkswagen T-Roc R-Line

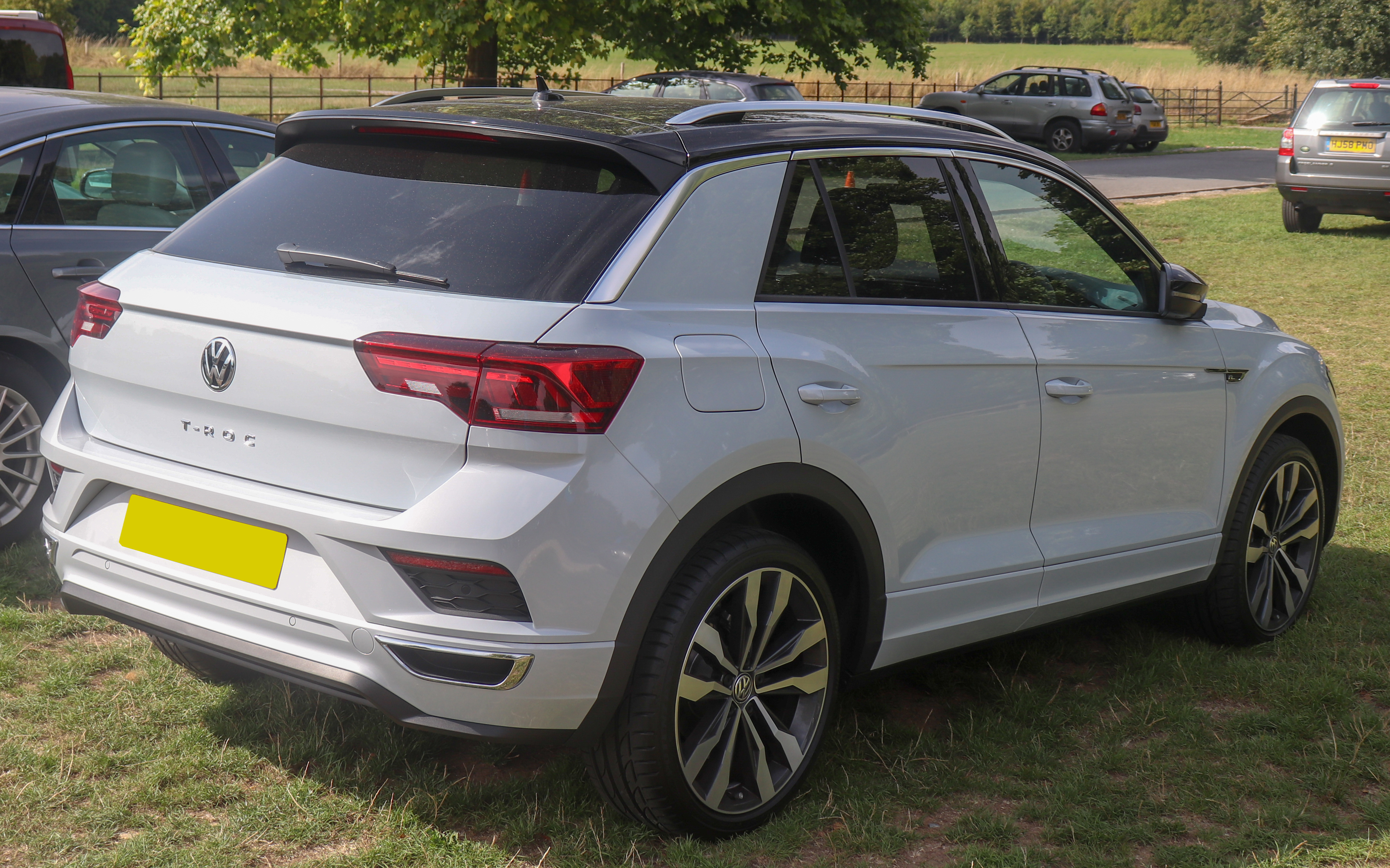
Rear view

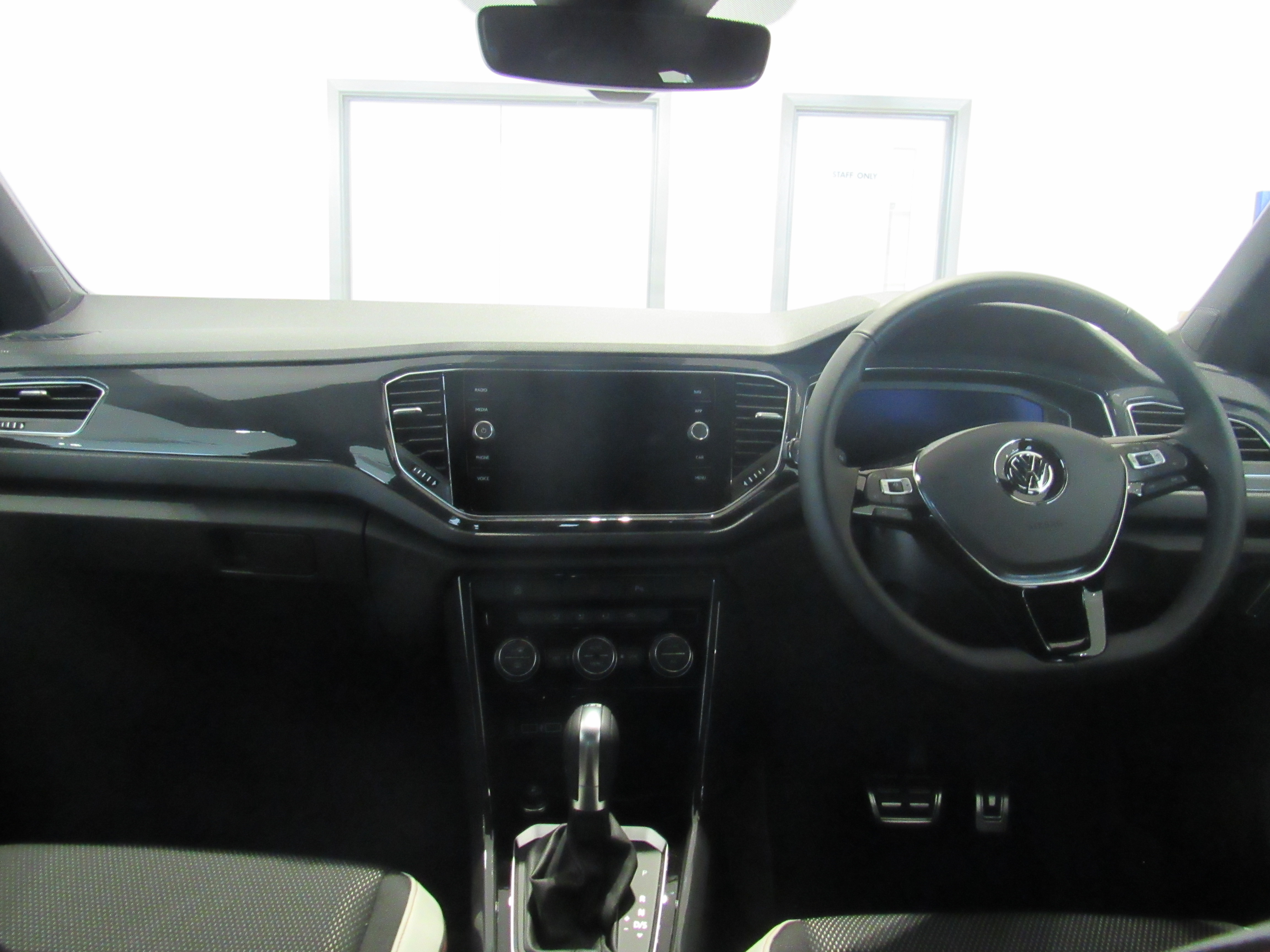
Interior

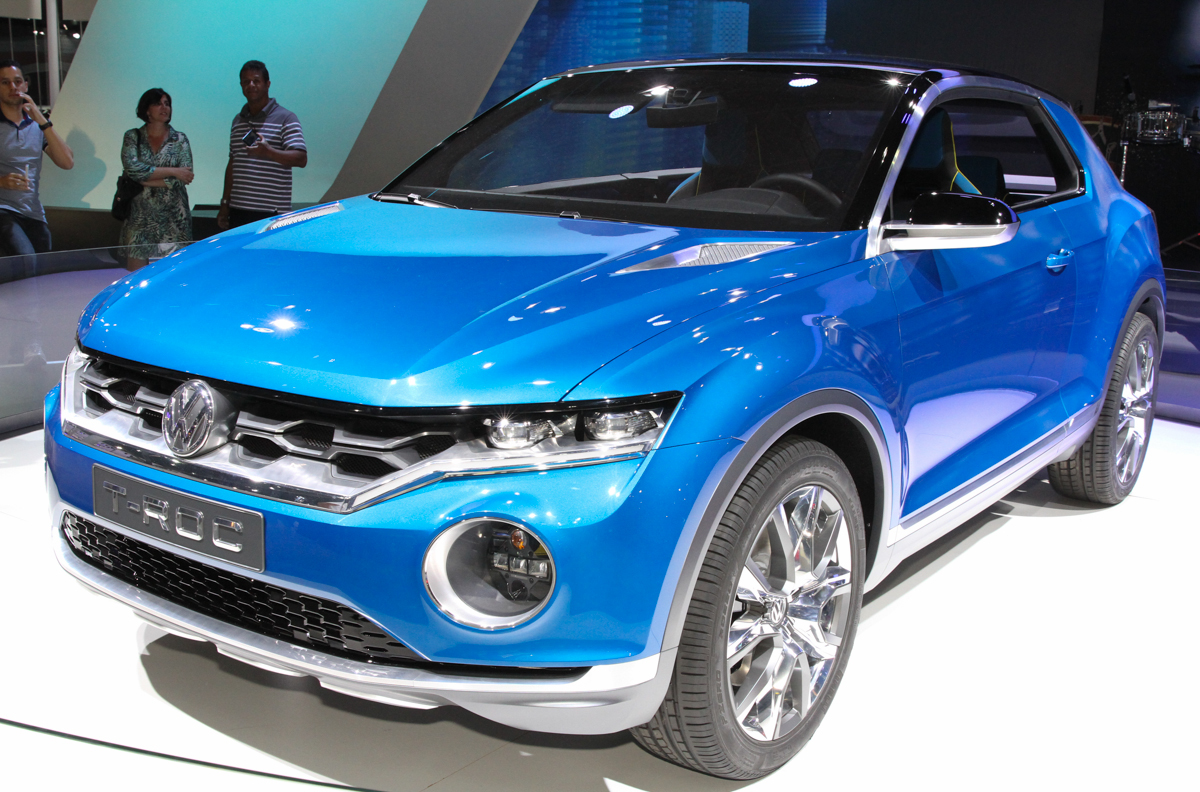
Volkswagen T-Roc Concept

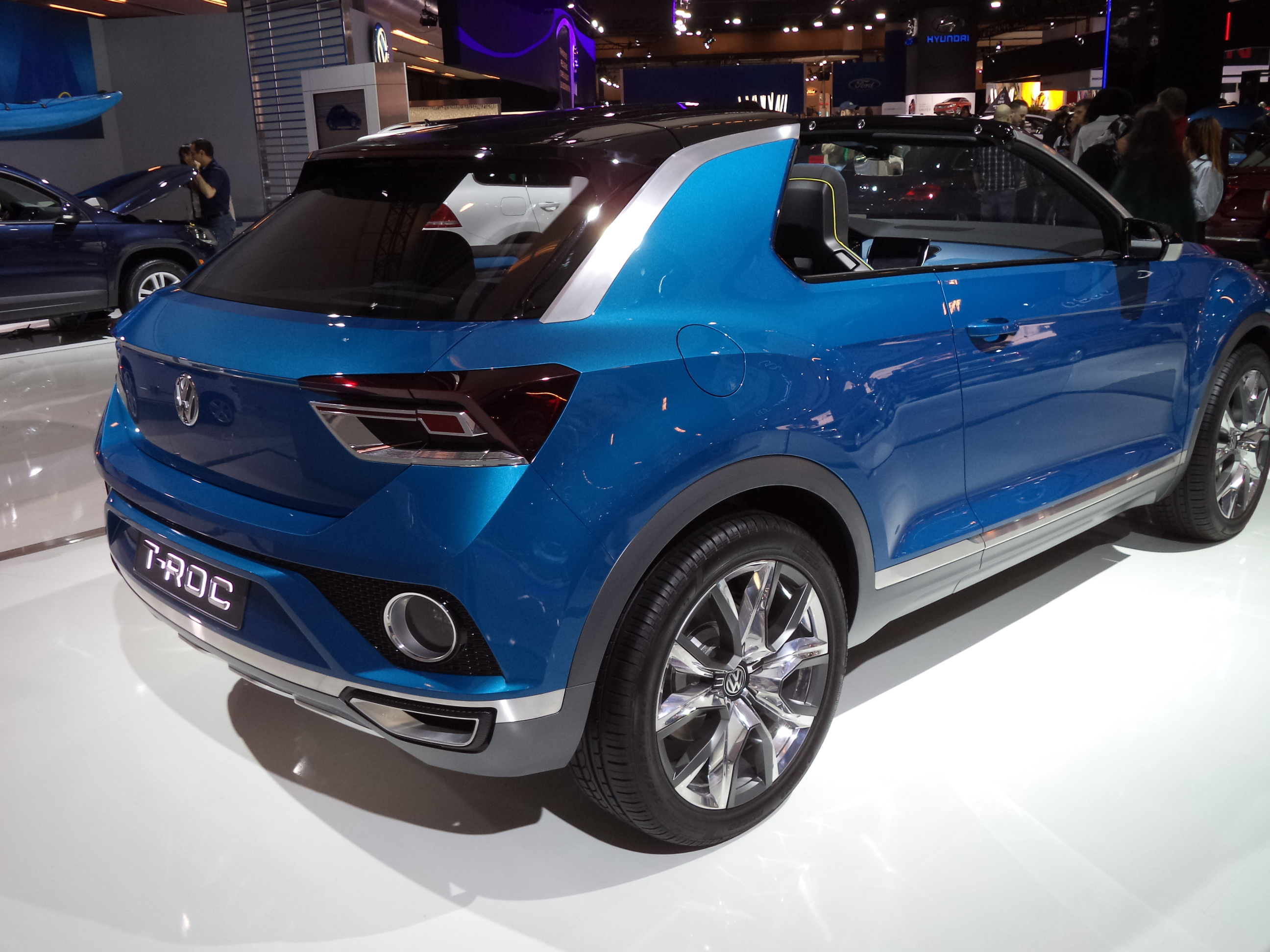
Rear view

=== China ===
Previewed earlier as the Volkswagen T-Rocstar concept, the T-Roc was unveiled to the Chinese market on 23 March 2018 and went on sale on 30 July 2018. The Chinese version of the T-Roc is larger than the European one, having the wheelbase longer by 90 mm, length by 84 mm, and its height taller by 9 mm. It is equipped with two 1.4-litre TSI engine options with either 130 PS (128 hp; 96 kW) or 150 PS (148 hp; 110 kW), and an entry-level 1.2-litre TSI engine producing 115 PS (113 hp; 85 kW). The powertrains are mated with the 5-speed manual transmission, the DQ200 7-speed dry dual clutch transmission for two wheel-drive versions and the DQ381 7-speed wet dual clutch transmission for all-wheel-drive versions.

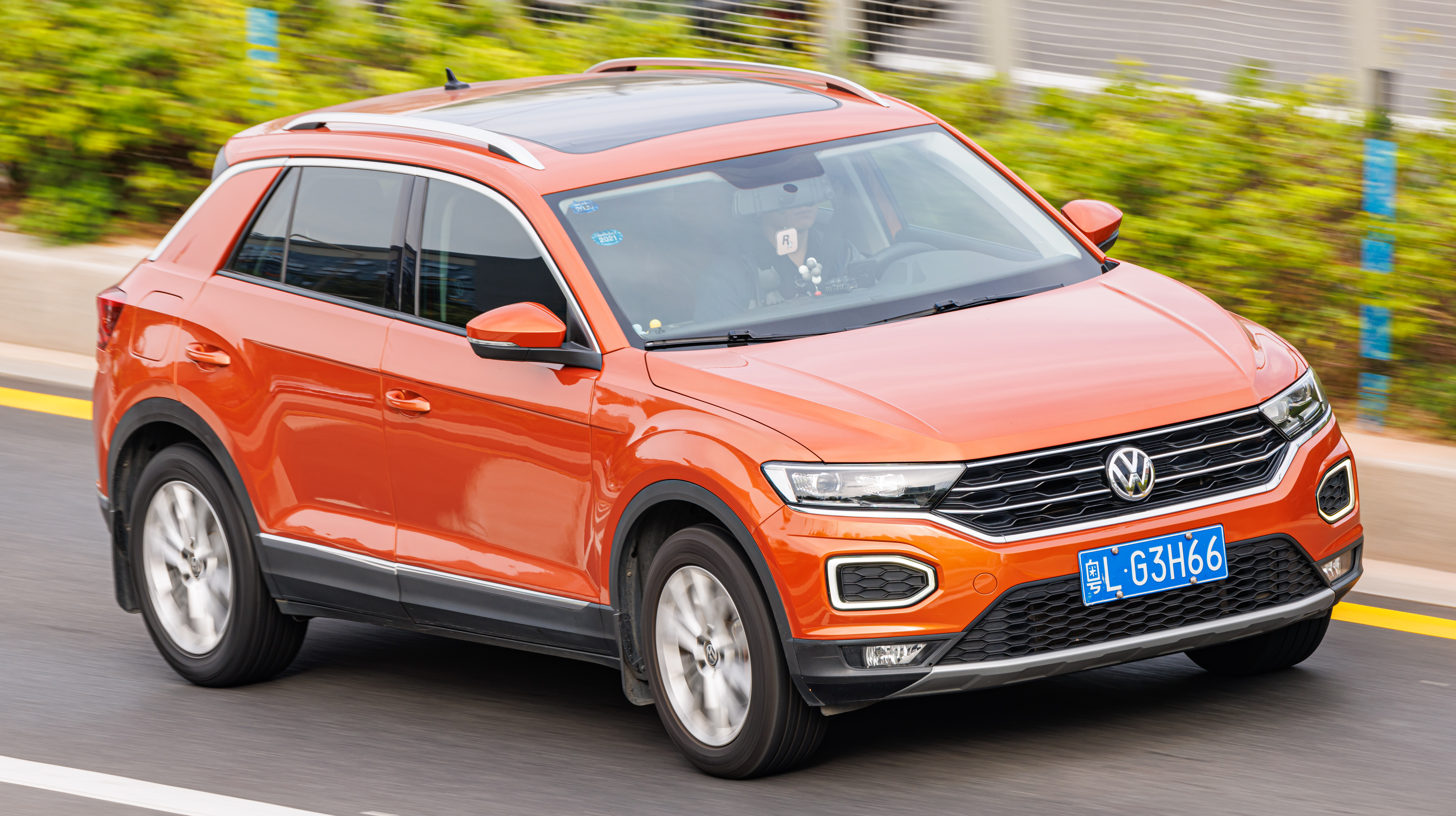
Front view

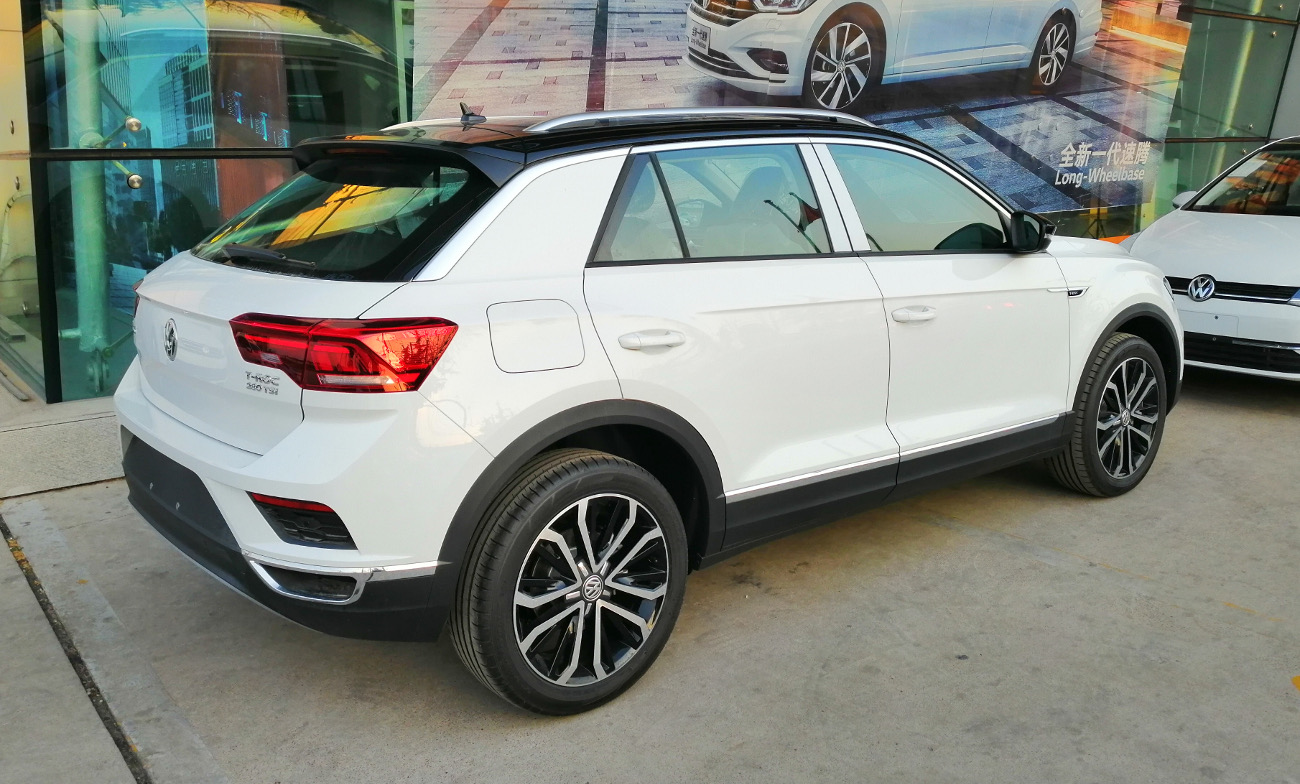
Rear view

=== Facelift ===
The T-Roc facelift was unveiled in November 2021.

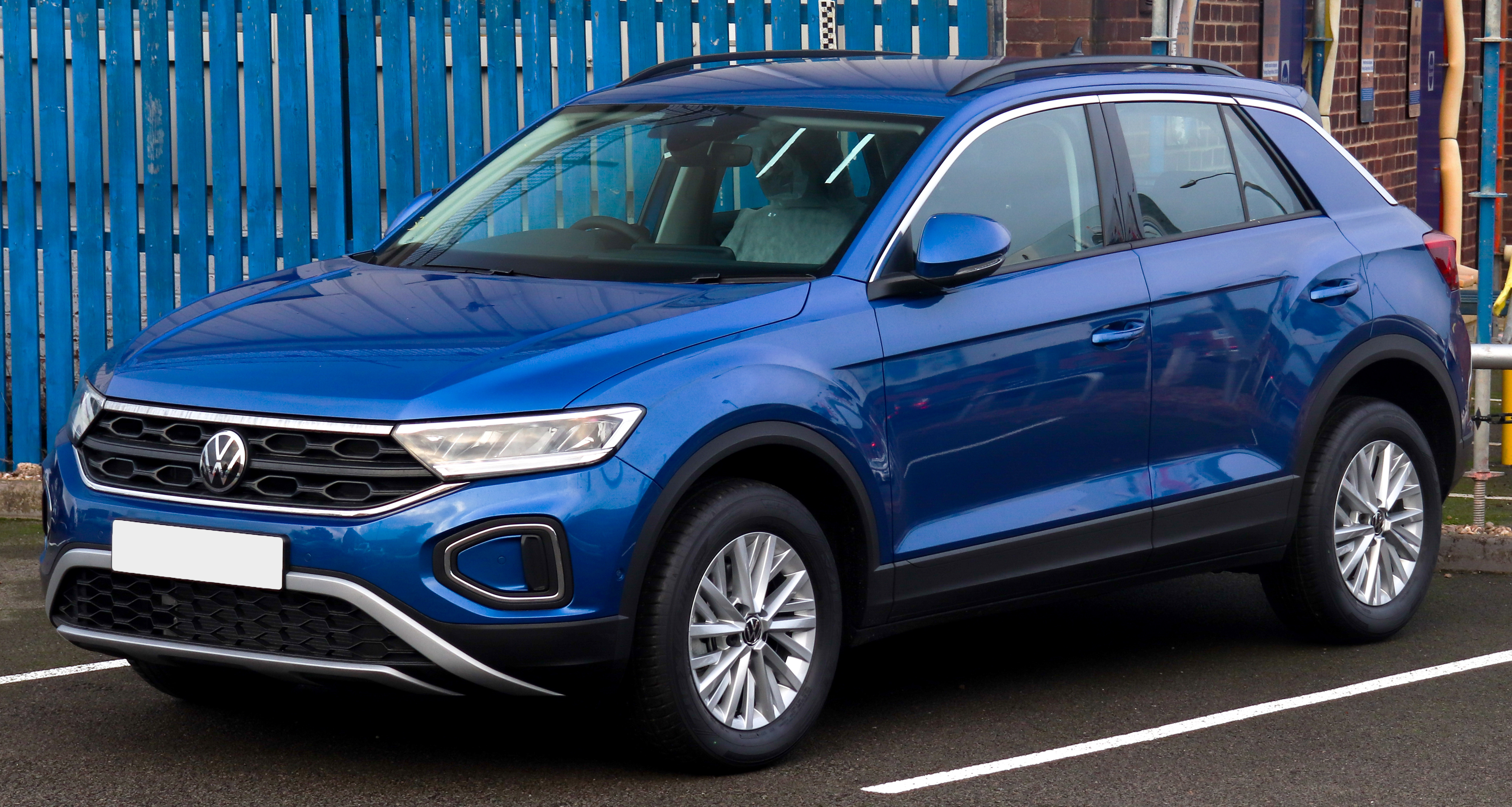
2022 Volkswagen T-Roc

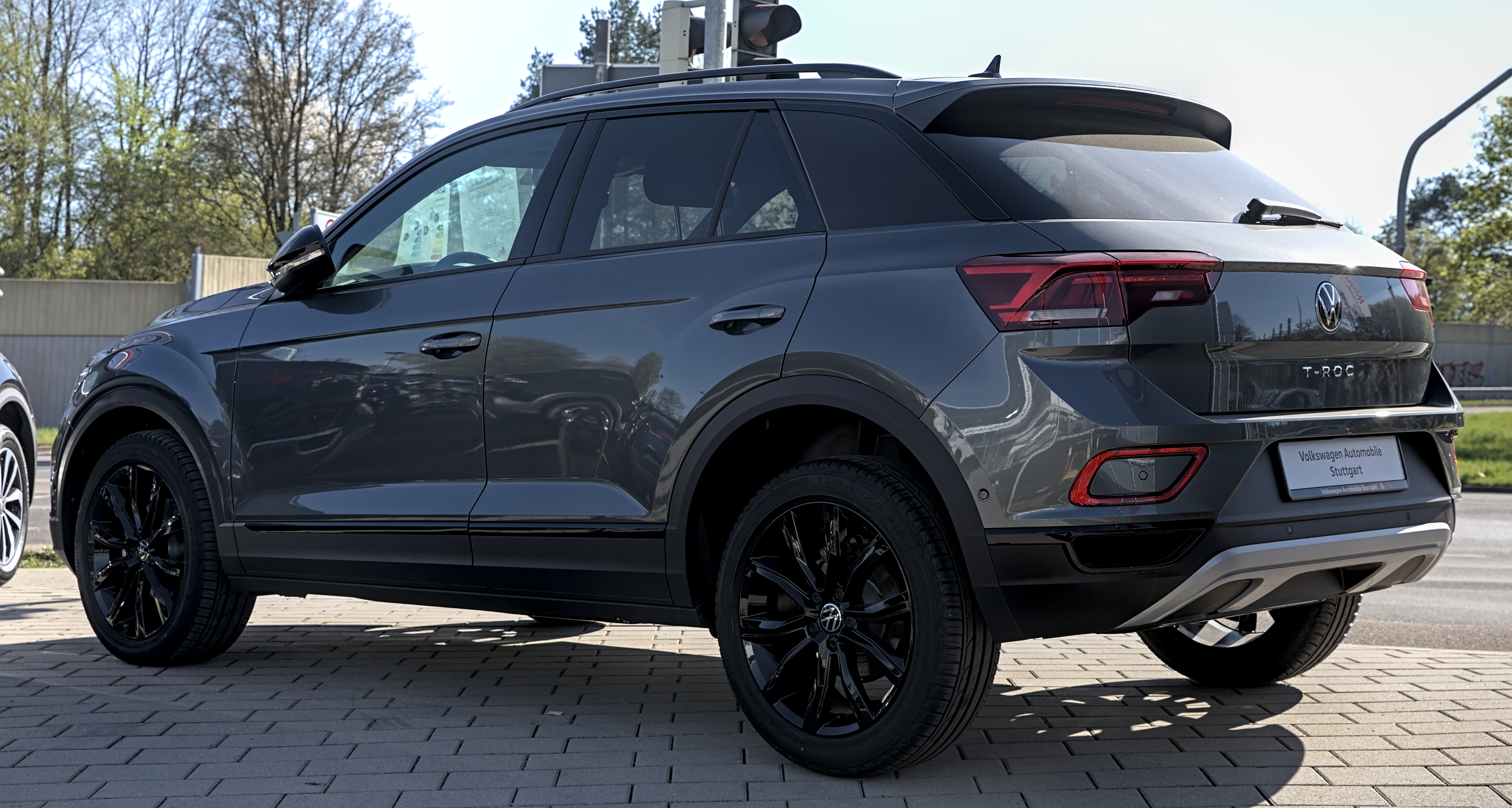
Rear view

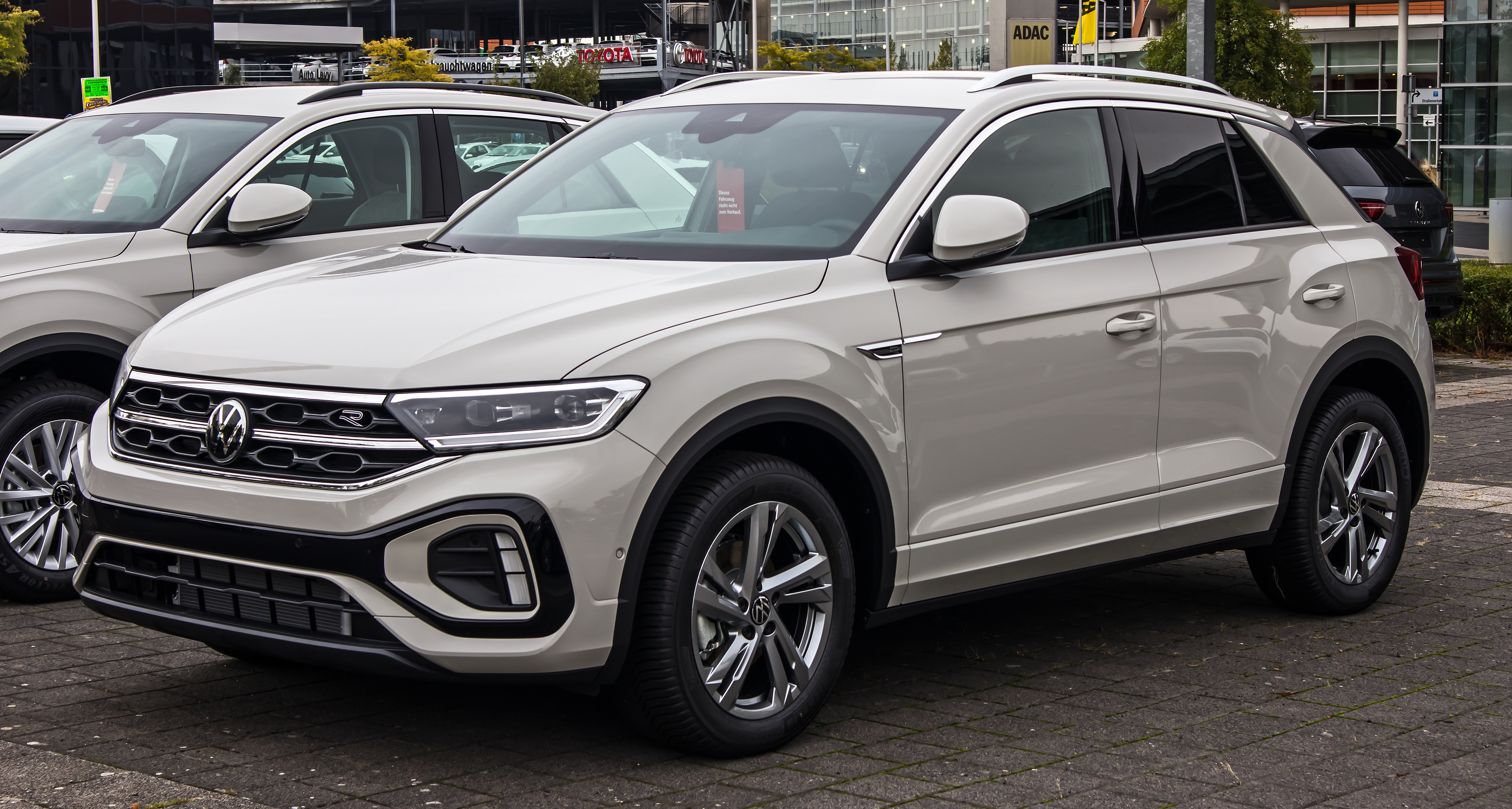
2022 Volkswagen T-Roc R-Line

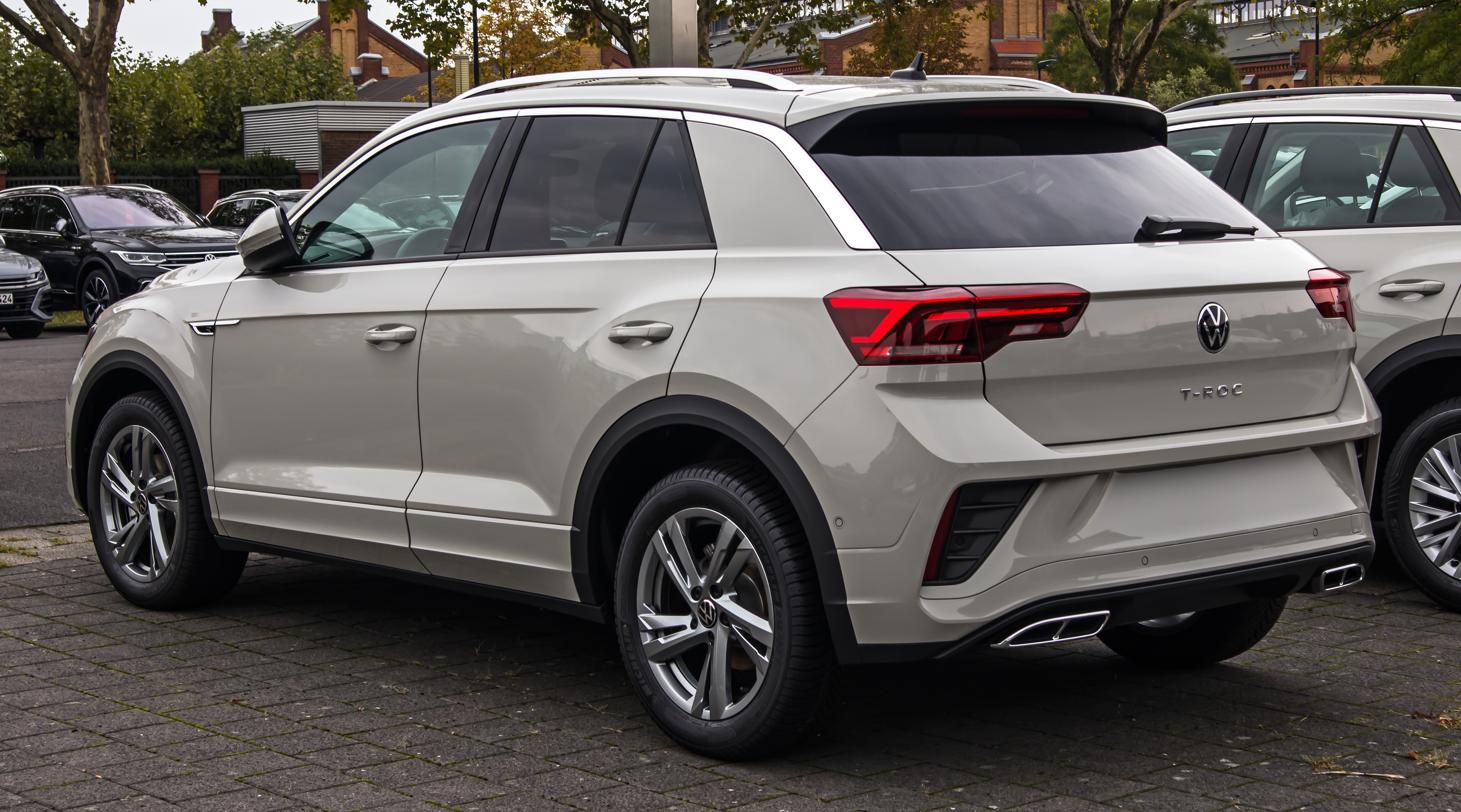
Rear view

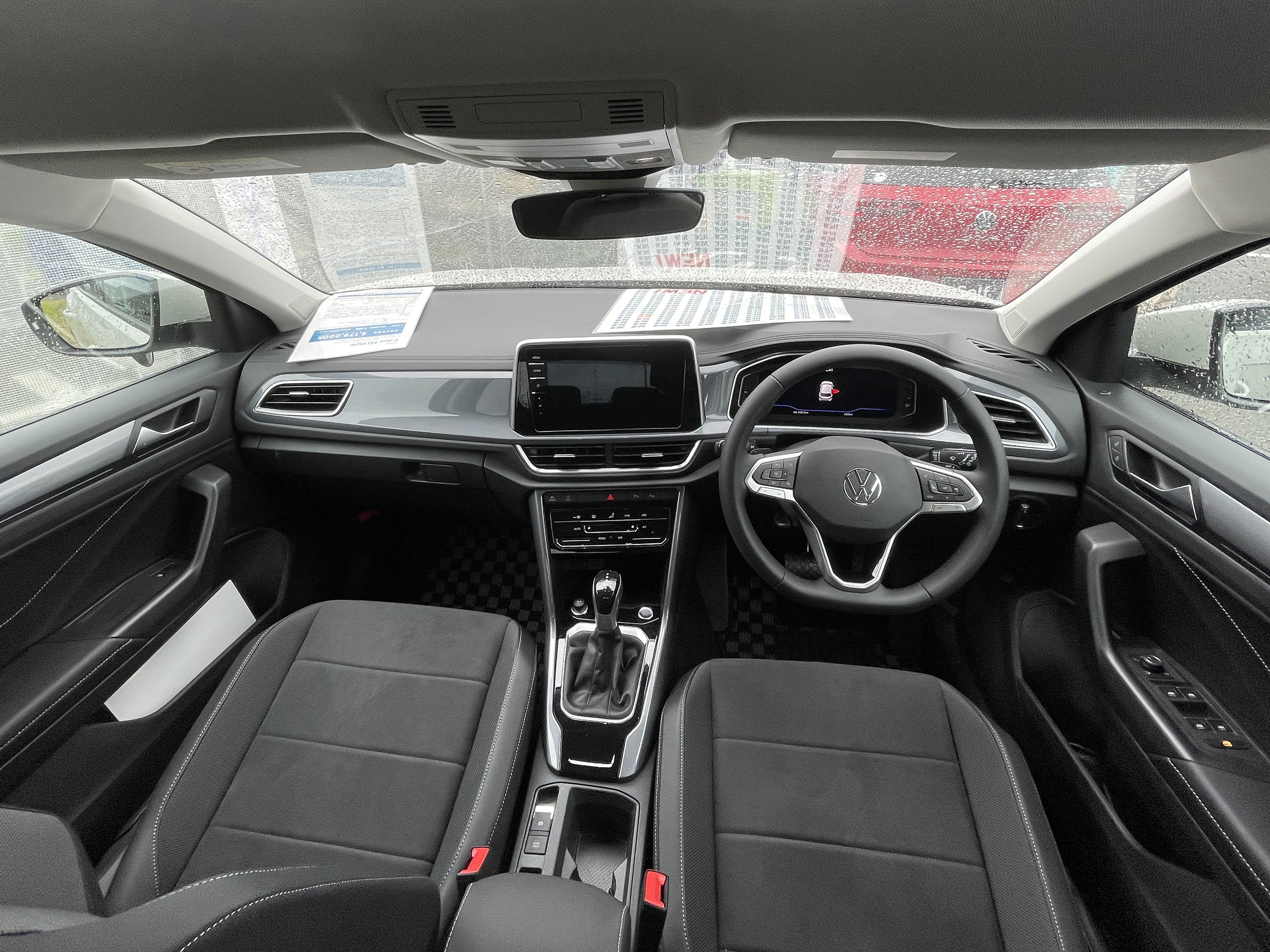
Interior

The T-Roc for the Chinese market received another facelift in April 2023. The 2023 model year is equipped with the EA211 1.4 litre TSI engine producing 150 PS (148 hp; 110 kW) and 250 N⋅m (184 lb⋅ft) mated to a DQ200 7speed dual clutch transmission. A 1.5-litre turbo EA211 Evo2 engine is also available producing 160 PS (158 hp; 118 kW) and 250 N⋅m (184 lb⋅ft).

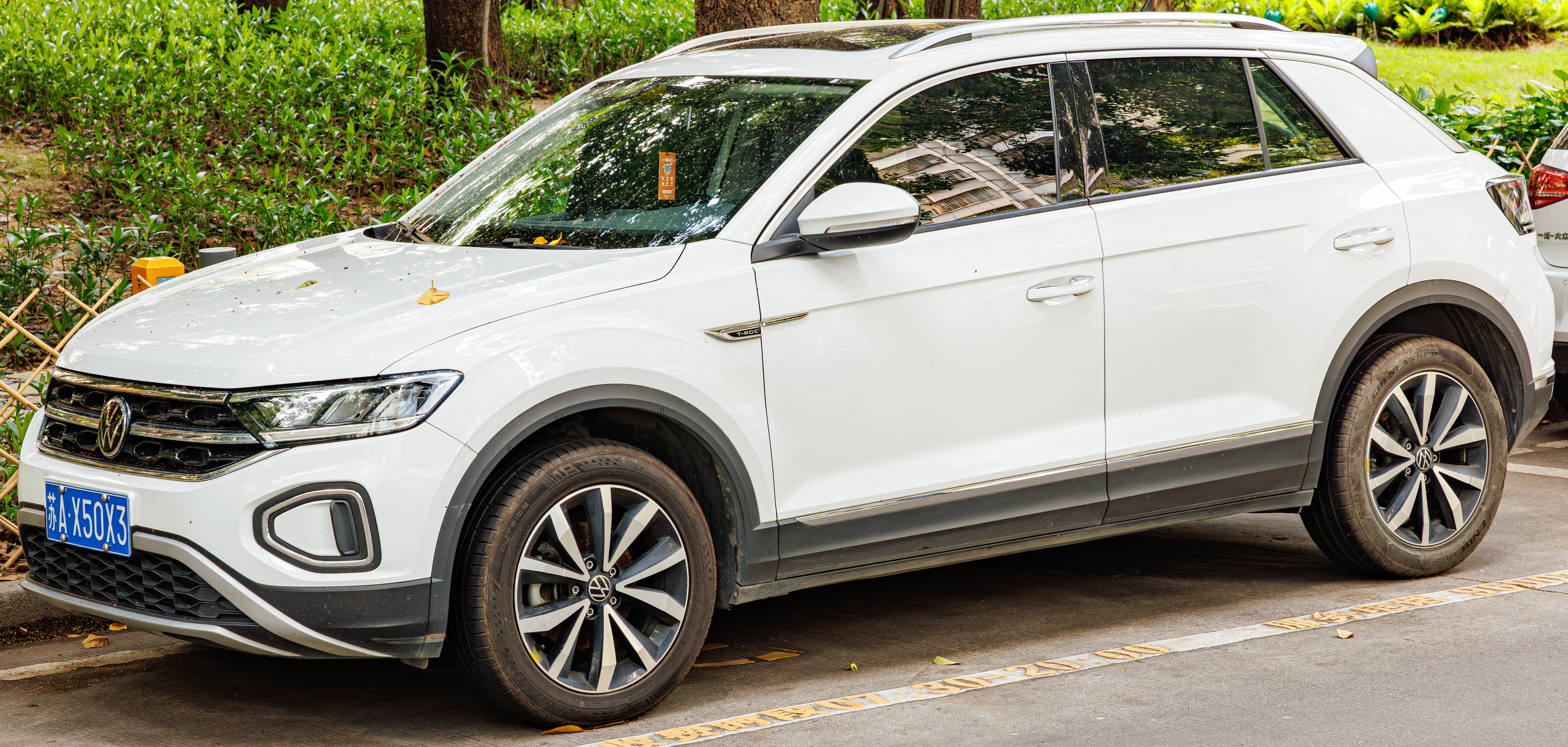
2023 Volkswagen T-Roc (China, facelift)

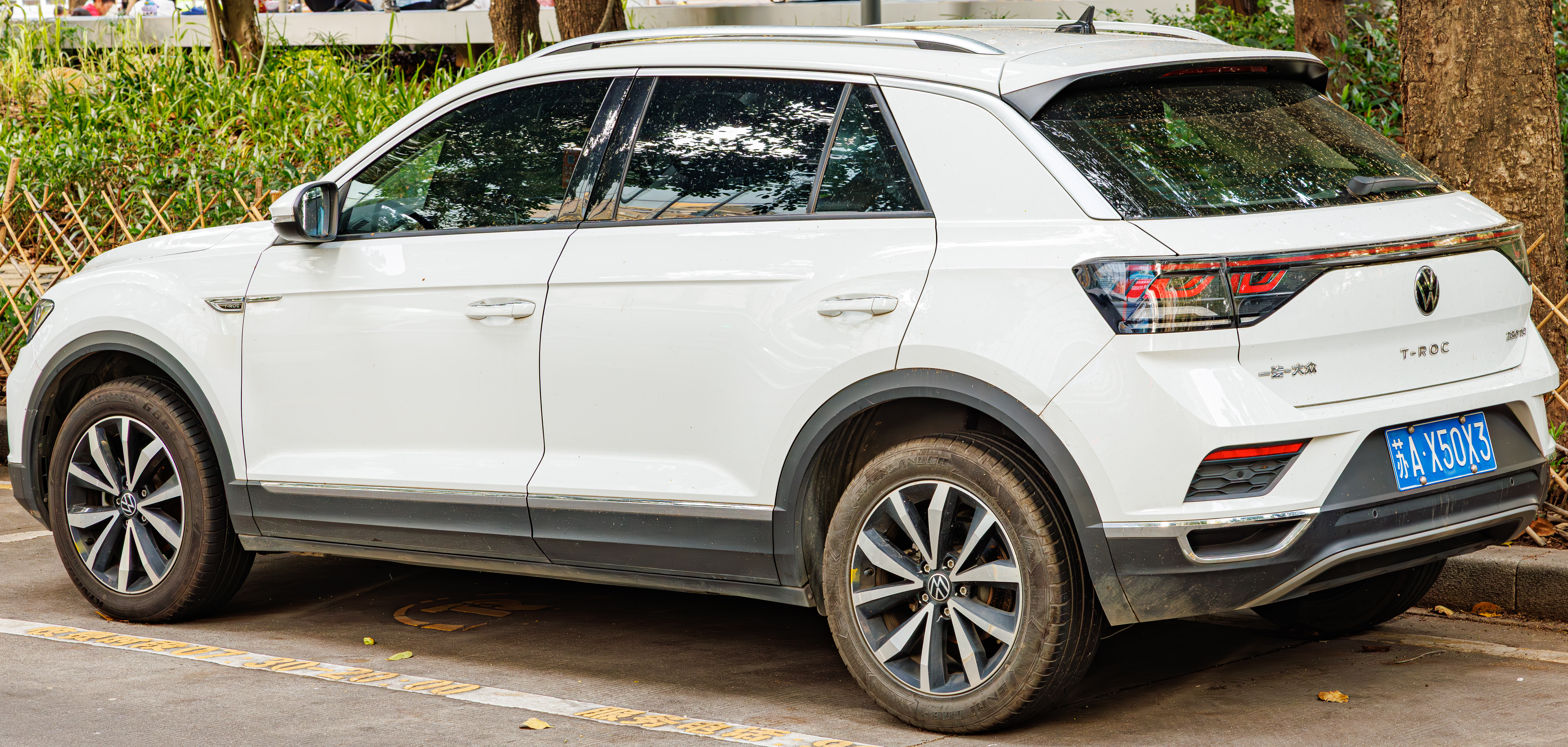
Rear view

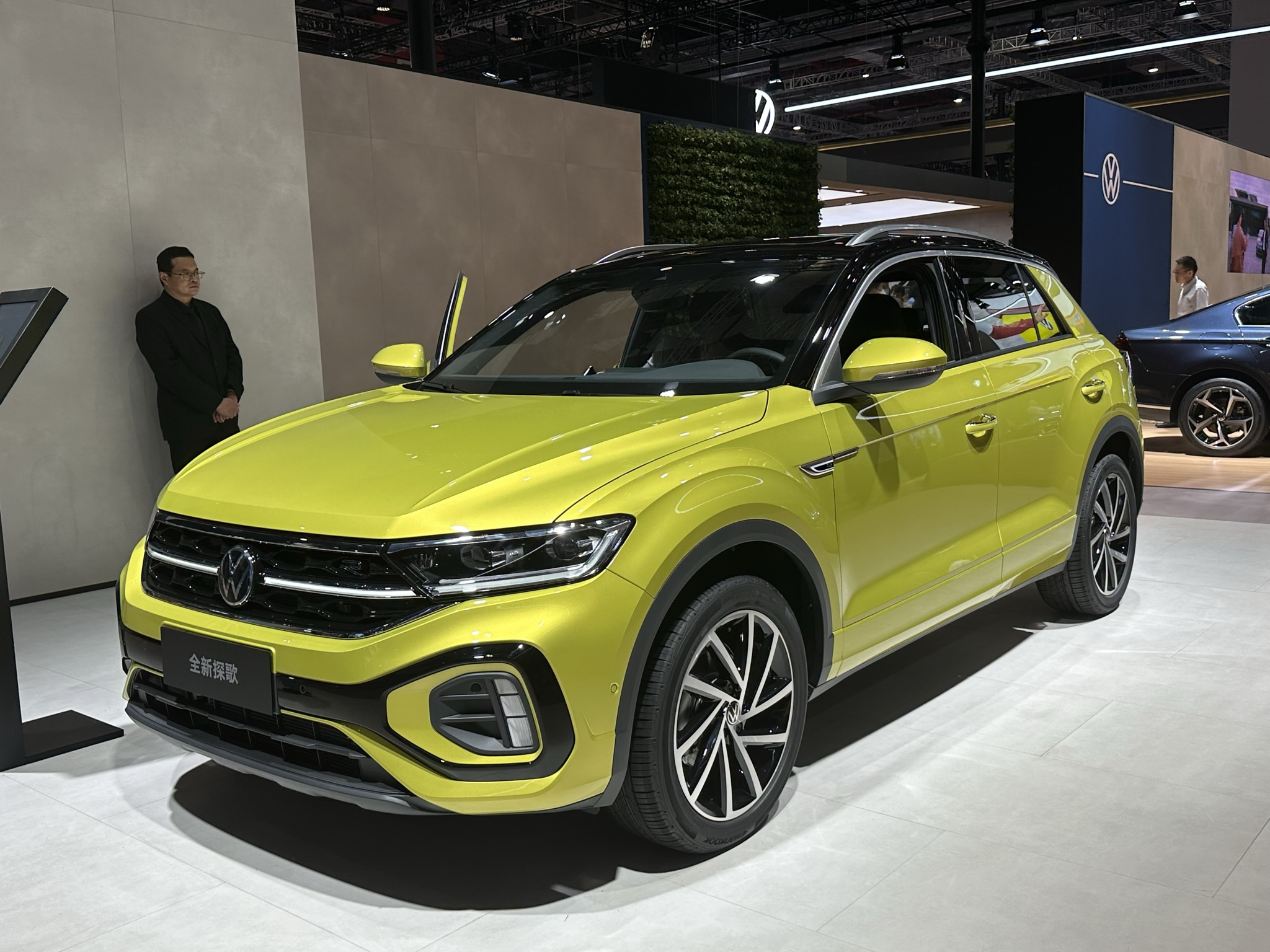
2023 Volkswagen T-Roc R-Line (China, facelift)

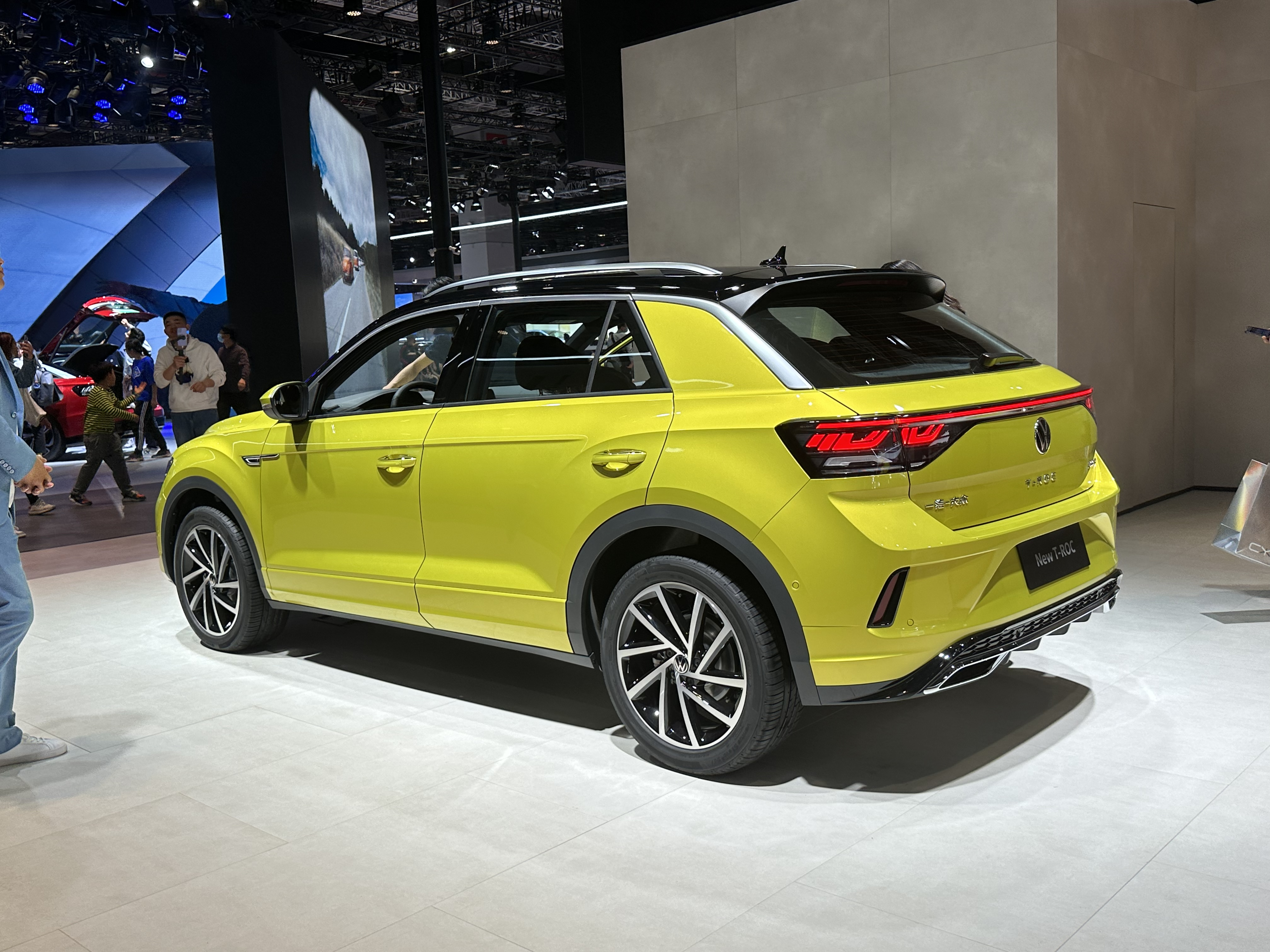
Rear view

=== T-Roc R ===
A high performance version of the T-Roc was launched as the T-Roc R in February 2019. It shared the same EA888 2.0-litre turbocharged petrol engine with the Golf R, making 300 PS (221 kW; 296 hp) and 400 N⋅m (295 lb⋅ft). It is offered with 4Motion all-wheel-drive carried over from the Golf R as standard. With a new suspension setup, it is also 20 mm (0.8 in) lower than the standard car. It also comes with extra kit, including Akrapovič quad-exhausts and interior upgrades.

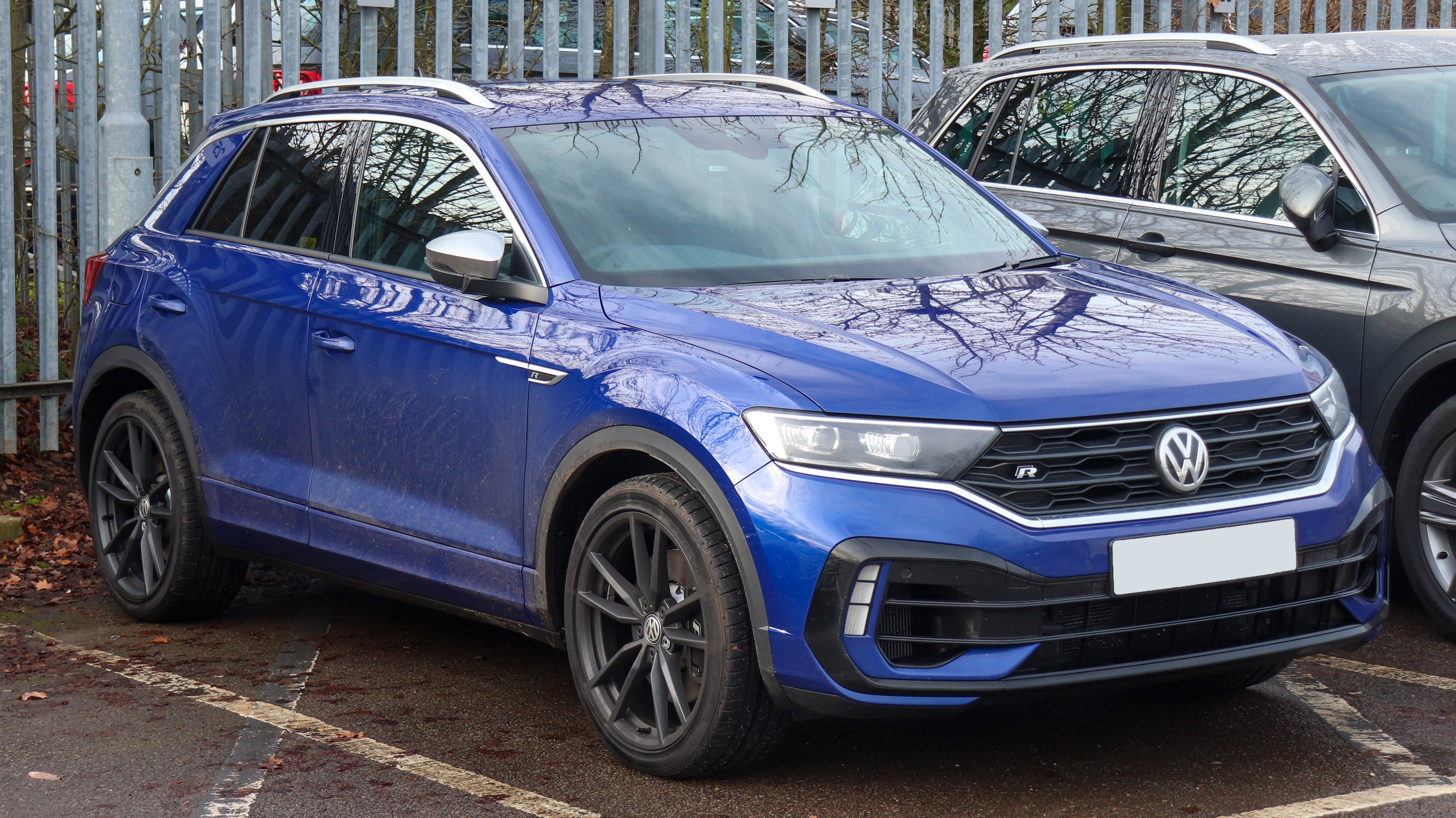
Volkswagen T-Roc R

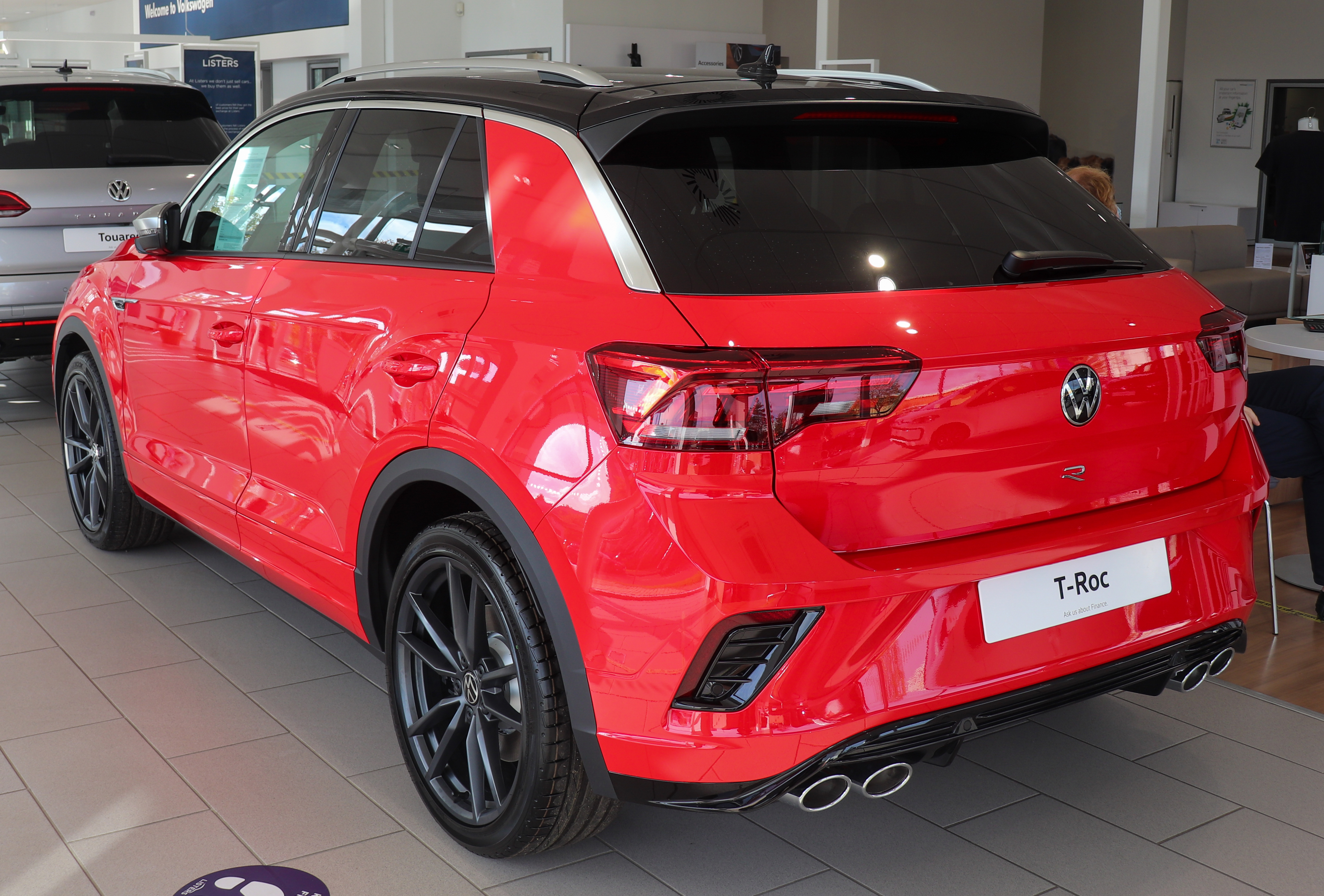
Volkswagen T-Roc R

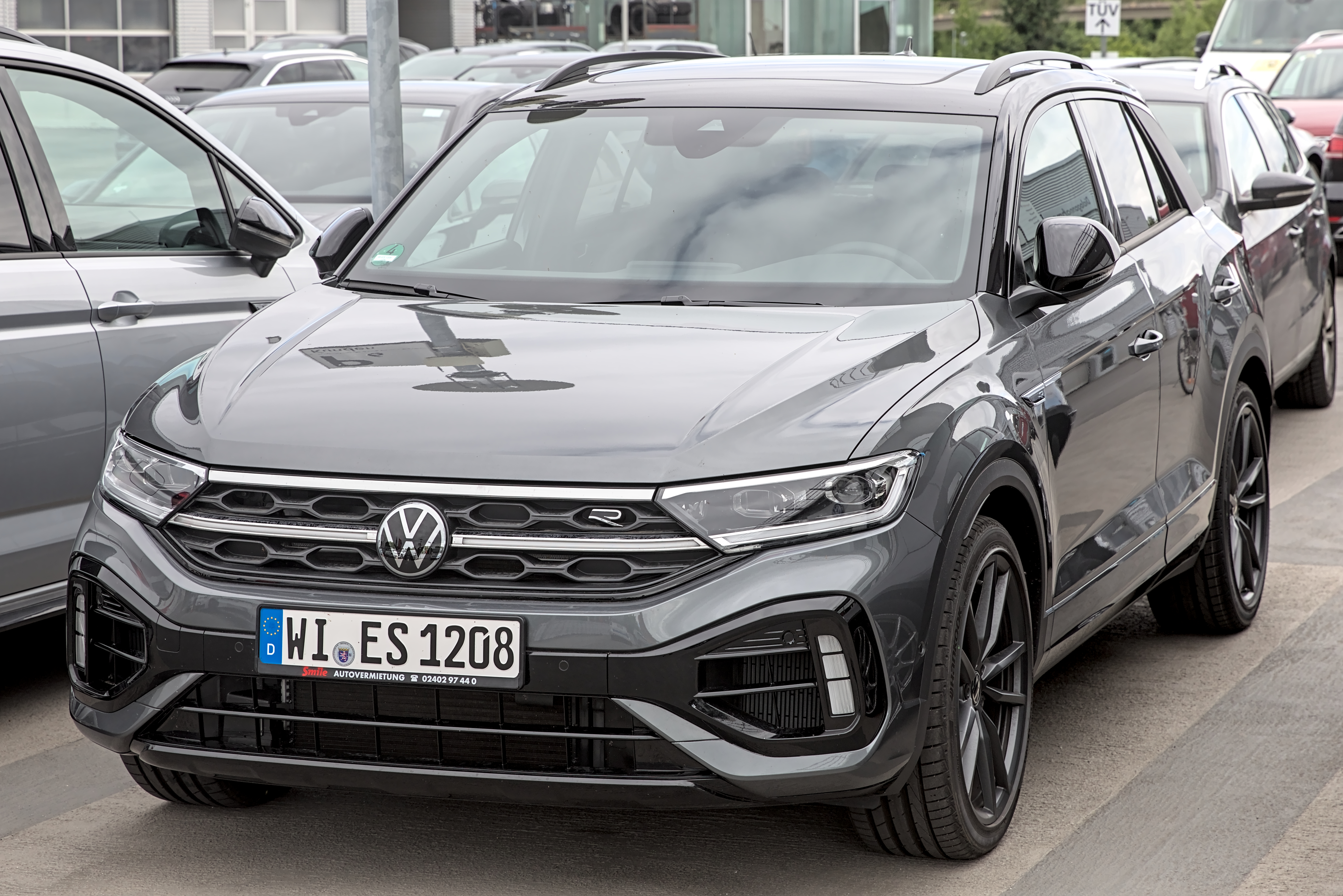
2022 Volkswagen T-Roc R

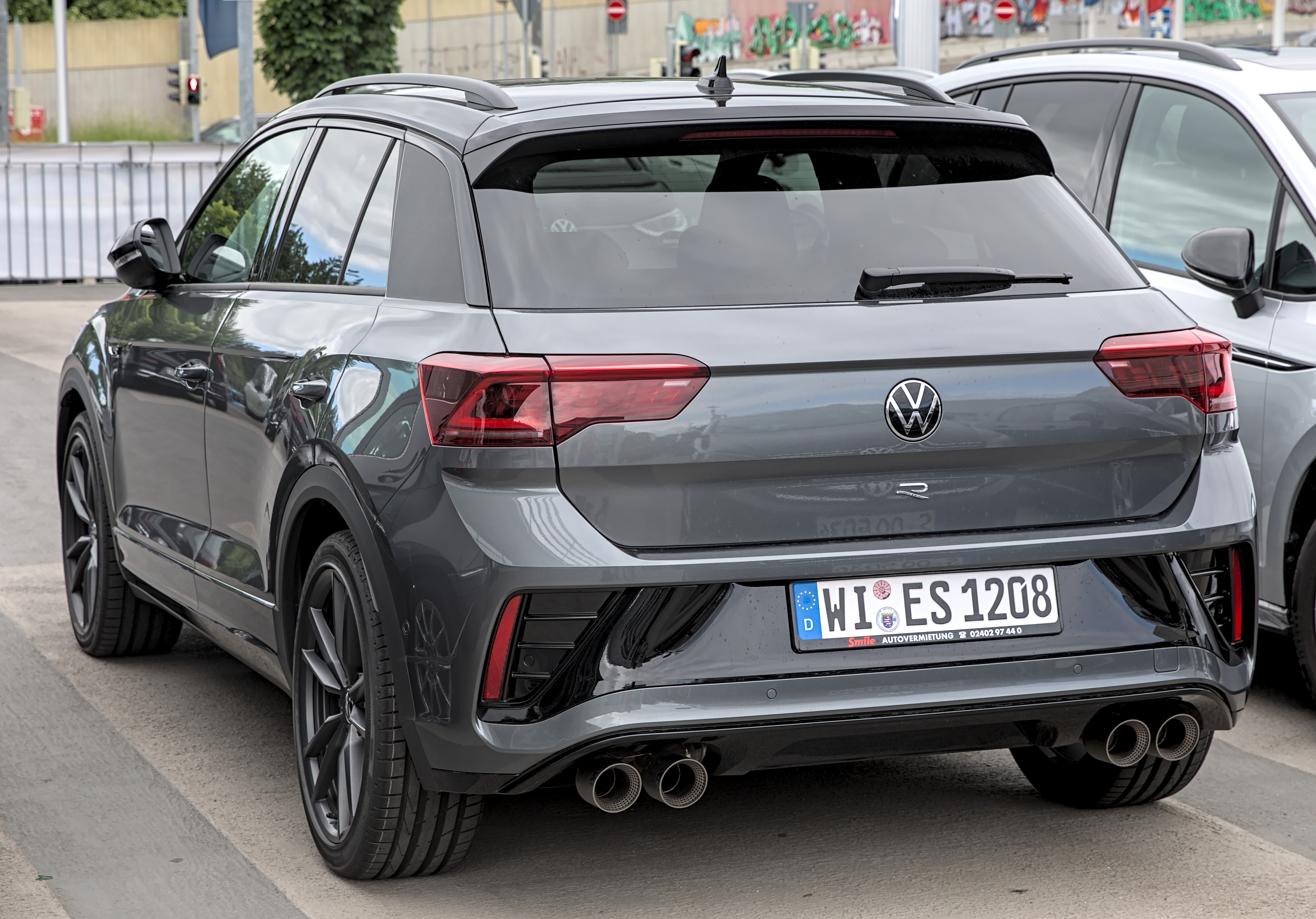
2022 Volkswagen T-Roc R

=== Cabriolet (AC7) (2020) ===
The T-Roc Cabriolet was launched in Germany in April 2020 as VW's first convertible model in two years. Despite being based on the standard SUV model, the model does not share many body panels with the standard T-Roc, since every sheet metal behind the front wheel arches is new, and it features a longer wheelbase. It loses two rear side doors and the B-pillar in order to make the folding fabric roof possible. To deal with the loss of rigidity caused by the absent roof and B-pillar, the chassis has been strengthened with new crossbeams, and the A-pillar has been reinforced.

The roof mechanism is hidden behind the bodywork next to the rear seats, which meant the rear seat can only accommodate two passengers. Instead of a wide-opening tailgate, the boot is accessed by a smaller gap. The boot is smaller with only 284 litres available, a reduction of 161 litres over the standard version. The fabric roof can be opened or closed at speeds of up to 30 km/h (19 mph), taking only nine seconds to retract at the press of a button and 11 seconds to raise it. The mechanism for the roof is shared with the discontinued Golf Cabriolet, and the soft top canvas is only available in black.

VW narrowed down the engine range of the wider T-Roc crossover line-up to just two petrol engine options for the cabriolet, 1.0-litre three-cylinder unit, developing 115 PS (85 kW; 113 hp) and a 1.5-litre four-cylinder unit producing 150 PS (110 kW; 148 hp). It is only offered in just two trim levels, which are Design and R-Line. This variant is assembled in Volkswagen plant in Osnabrück, Germany as the plant is a specialist in terms of designing and manufacturing convertible models.

It was reported that Volkswagen brand CEO Herbert Diess was dismissive and derisive of the idea of a convertible SUV, believing any vehicle in the segment will not be successful just months before announcing the T-Roc Cabriolet.

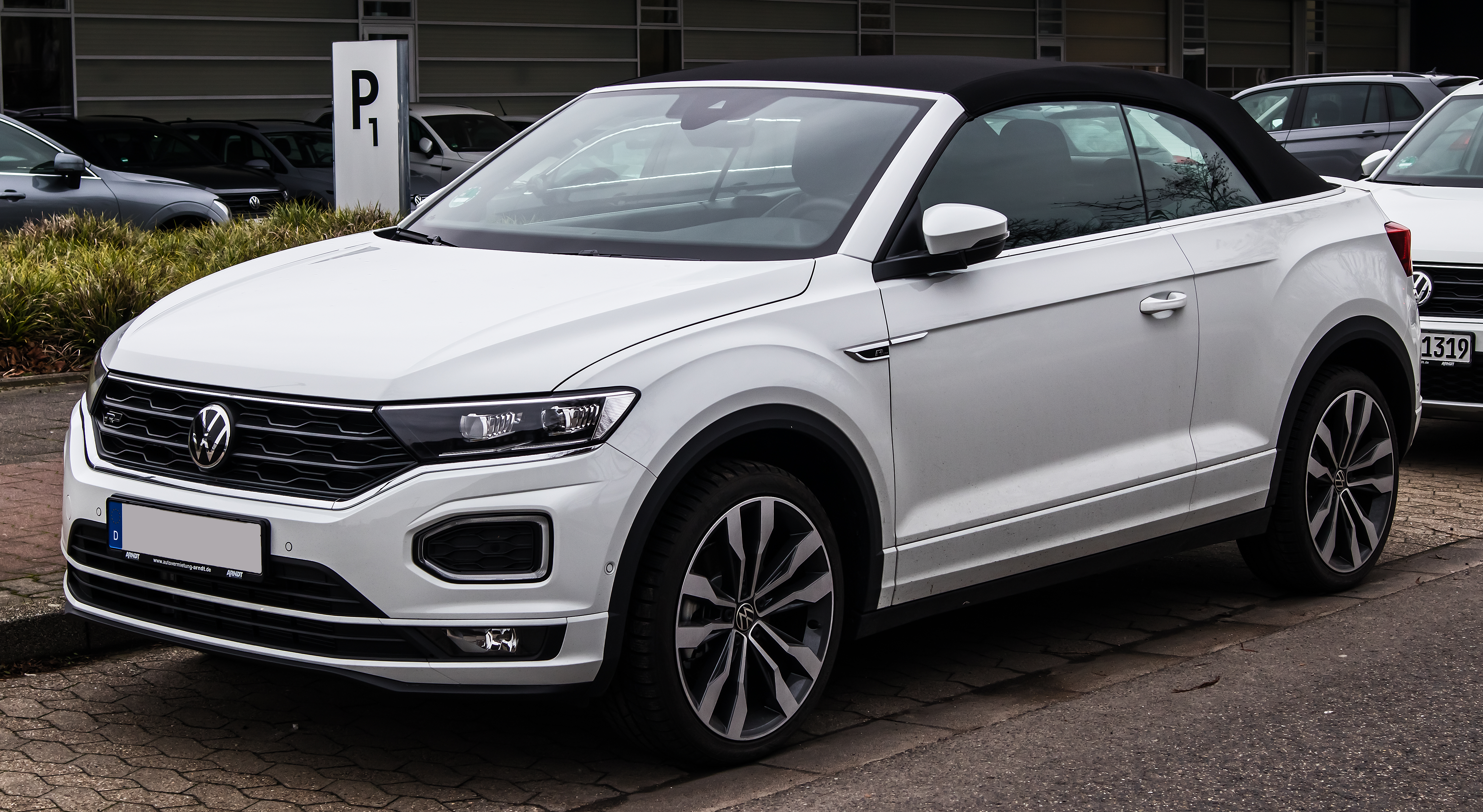
Pre-facelift (front)

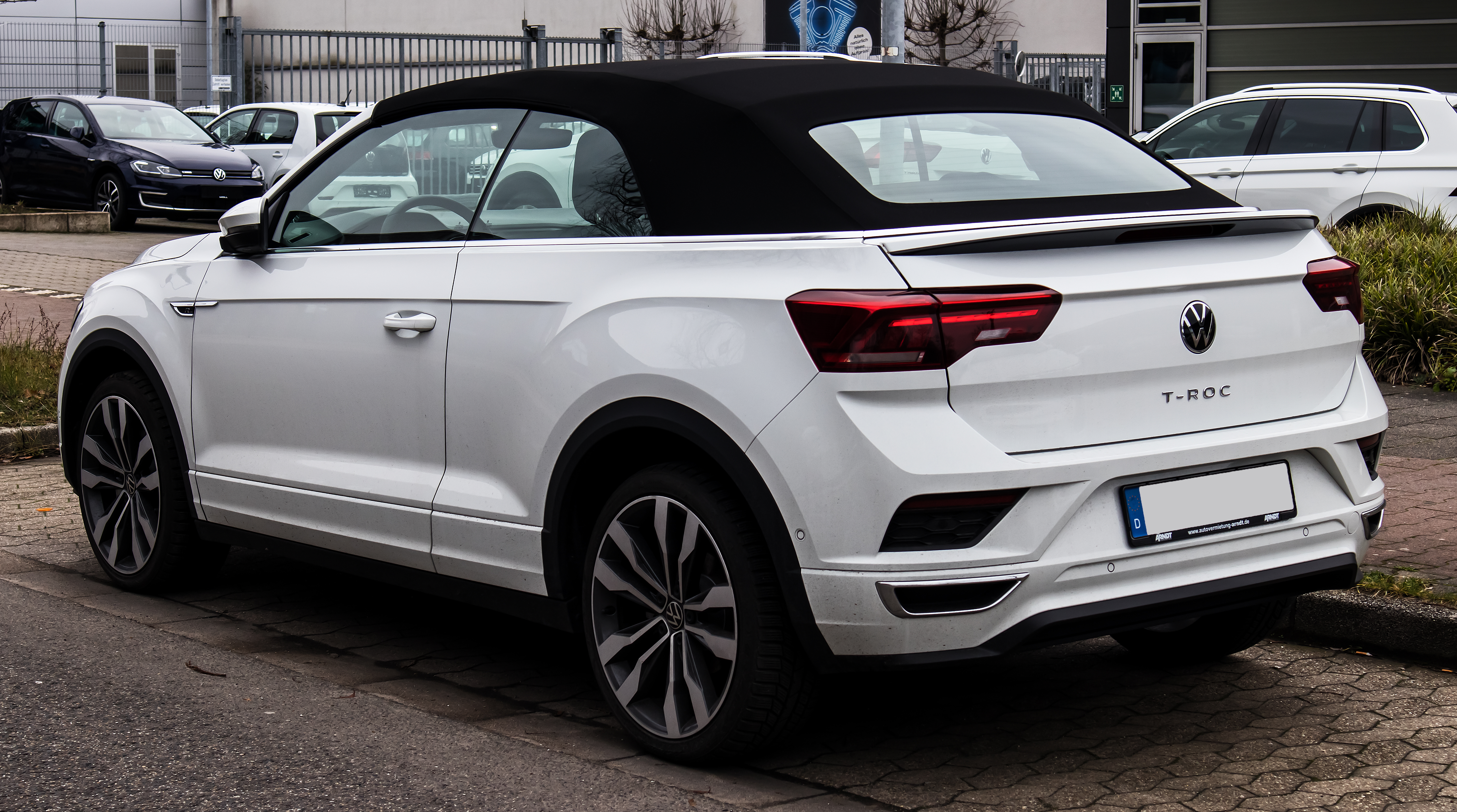
Pre-facelift (rear)

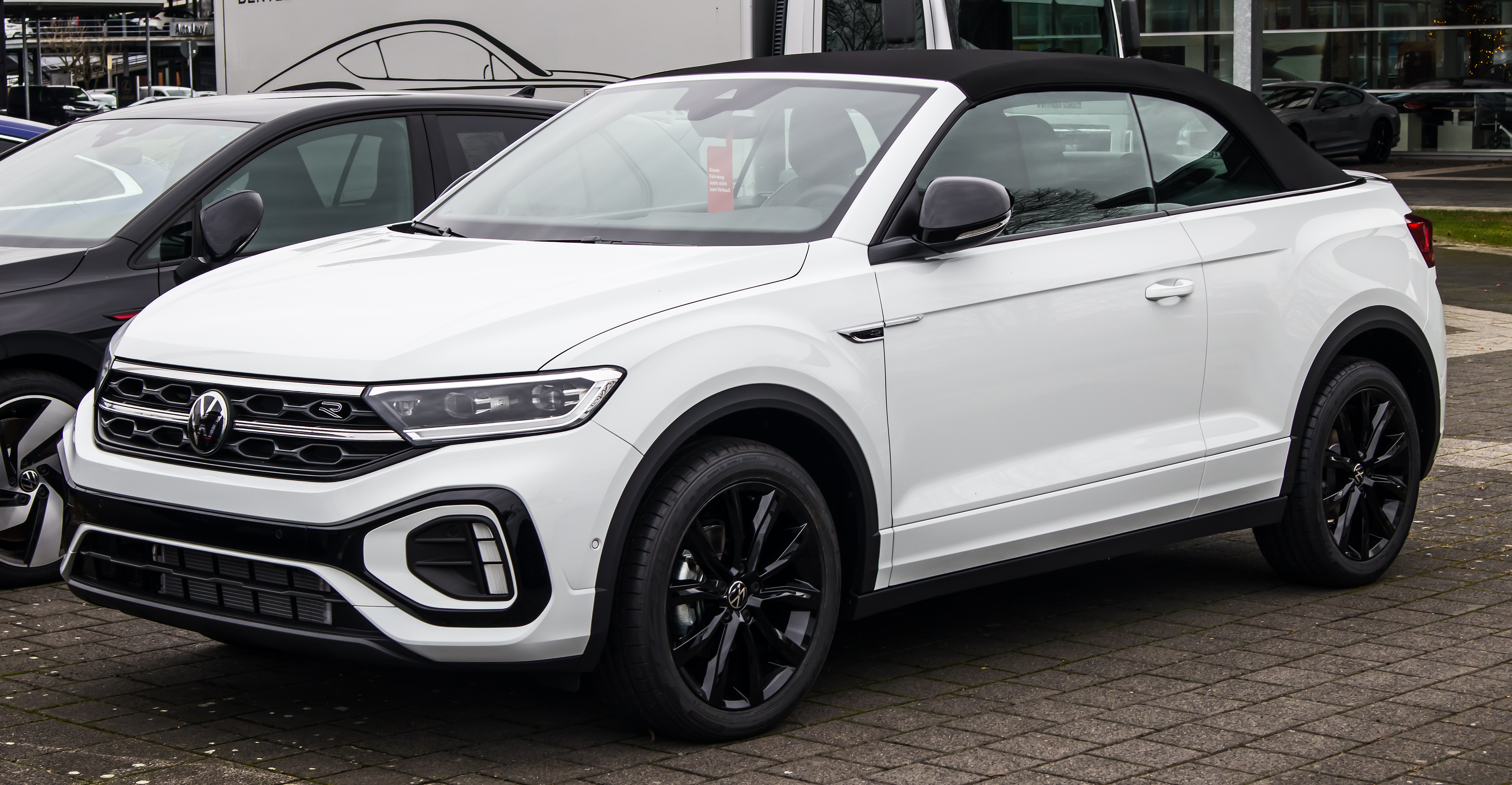
Facelift (front)

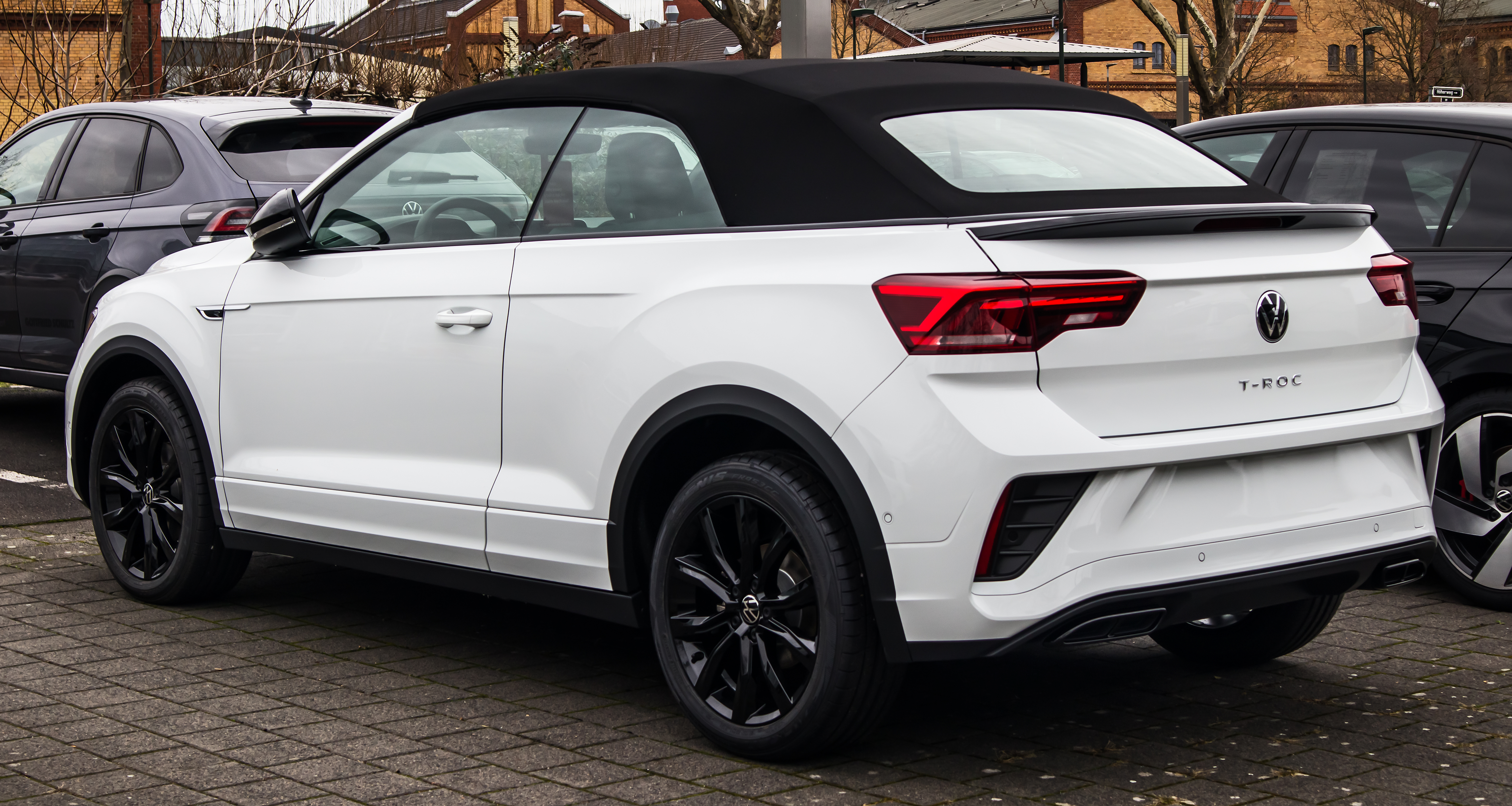
Facelift (rear)

=== Edition Grey ===
Unveiled in December 2022, the T-Roc Cabriolet 'Edition Grey' features a matte body color alongside the R-Line body kit and black accents on the exterior and interior. The first deliveries started in February 2023 in Germany.

=== Powertrain ===
In Europe, there are a variety of turbocharged petrol and diesel engines offered. For petrol engines, there are 1.0-litre TSI 115 PS (85 kW; 113 hp) turbo, 1.5-litre TSI Evo 150 PS (110 kW; 148 hp) with cylinder deactivation, the 2.0-litre TSI 190 PS (140 kW; 187 hp) petrol and the range-topping 2.0-litre TSI 300 PS (221 kW; 296 hp) for the T-Roc R. All petrol engines come with a 6-speed manual except the 2.0-litre TSI, which has a 7-speed DSG transmission, while it is available as an option with the 1.5-litre TSI Evo engine. 4Motion four-wheel drive is also standard with the 2.0-litre TSI. Diesel engines available are the 1.6 TDI 115 PS (85 kW; 113 hp) with a 6-speed manual or 2.0-litre TDI 150 PS (110 kW; 148 hp) with a 7-speed DSG transmission.

Petrol engines
Model	Displacement	Power	Torque	Transmission	Market
1.0 TSI 115	999 cc I3	115 PS (85 kW; 113 hp)	200 N⋅m (148 lb⋅ft)	6-speed manual	Europe
1.2 TSI '200 TSI'^{∗}	1,197 cc I4	115 PS (85 kW; 113 hp)	175 N⋅m (129 lb⋅ft)	5-speed manual	China
1.4 TSI '230 TSI'^{∗}	1,395 cc I4	130 PS (96 kW; 128 hp)	225 N⋅m (166 lb⋅ft)	7-speed DSG	China
1.4 TSI '280 TSI'^{∗}	1,395 cc I4	150 PS (110 kW; 148 hp)	250 N⋅m (184 lb⋅ft)	7-speed DSG	China
1.5 TSI '300 TSI'^{∗}	1,498 cc I4	160 PS(118kW; 158 hp)	250 N⋅m (184 lb⋅ft)	7-speed DSG	China
1.5 TSI 150	1,498 cc I4	150 PS (110 kW; 148 hp)	250 N⋅m (184 lb⋅ft)	6-speed manual or 7-speed DSG	Europe
2.0 TSI 190 4Motion	1,984 cc I4	190 PS (140 kW; 187 hp)	320 N⋅m (236 lb⋅ft)	7-speed DSG	Europe
2.0 TSI 4Motion (T-Roc R)	1,984 cc I4	300 PS (221 kW; 296 hp)	400 N⋅m (295 lb⋅ft)	7-speed DSG	Europe
Diesel engines
1.6 TDI 115	1,598 cc I4	115 PS (85 kW; 113 hp)	250 N⋅m (184 lb⋅ft)	6-speed manual	Europe
2.0 TDI 150 SCR 4Motion	1,968 cc I4	150 PS (110 kW; 148 hp)	320 N⋅m (236 lb⋅ft)	7-speed DSG	Europe

^{∗ Marketed and labeled as such in China}

=== Safety ===
==== ANCAP ====
ANCAP test results* Volkswagen T-Roc (2017, aligned with Euro NCAP)
Test	Points	%
Overall:	5 /5 stars	
Adult occupant:	36.5	96%
Child occupant:	43	87%
Pedestrian:	33.4	79%
Safety assist:	8.6	71%

==== Euro NCAP ====
Euro NCAP test results* Volkswagen T-Roc 1.0 TSI Comfortline (LHD) (2017)
Test	Points	%
Overall:	5 /5 stars	
Adult occupant:	36.6	96%
Child occupant:	43.0	87%
Pedestrian:	33.5	79%
Safety assist:	8.5	71%

== Second generation (2025) ==
Second generation
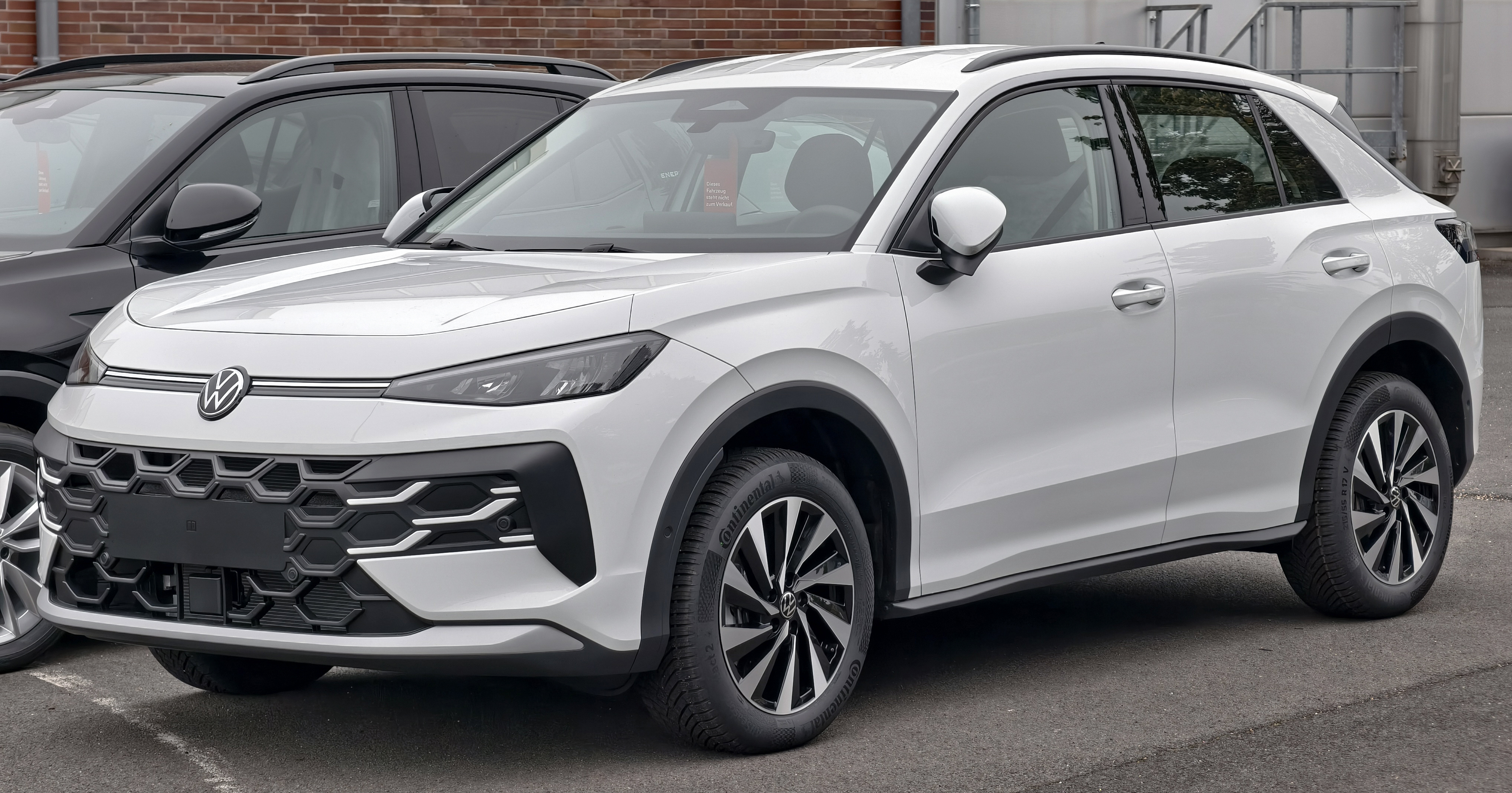
- 2026 T-Roc Life

Overview
- Production: November 2025–present
- Assembly: Portugal: Palmela (Autoeuropa)

Body and chassis
- Layout: Front-engine, front-wheel drive Front-engine, all-wheel-drive
- Platform: Volkswagen Group MQB Evo
- Related: Volkswagen Golf Mk8

Powertrain
- Engine: 1.5 TSI
- Transmission: 7-speed DSG (mHEV) Direct-drive (FHEV)

Dimensions
- Wheelbase: 2,631 mm (103.6 in)
- Length: 4,373 mm (172.2 in)
- Width: 1,828 mm (72.0 in)
- Height: 1,562 mm (61.5 in)
- Kerb weight: 1,465–1,474 kg (3,230–3,250 lb)

The second-generation T-Roc is built on the MQB Evo platform, which it shares with the Golf Mk8.5. The production version was officially presented on 27 August 2025.

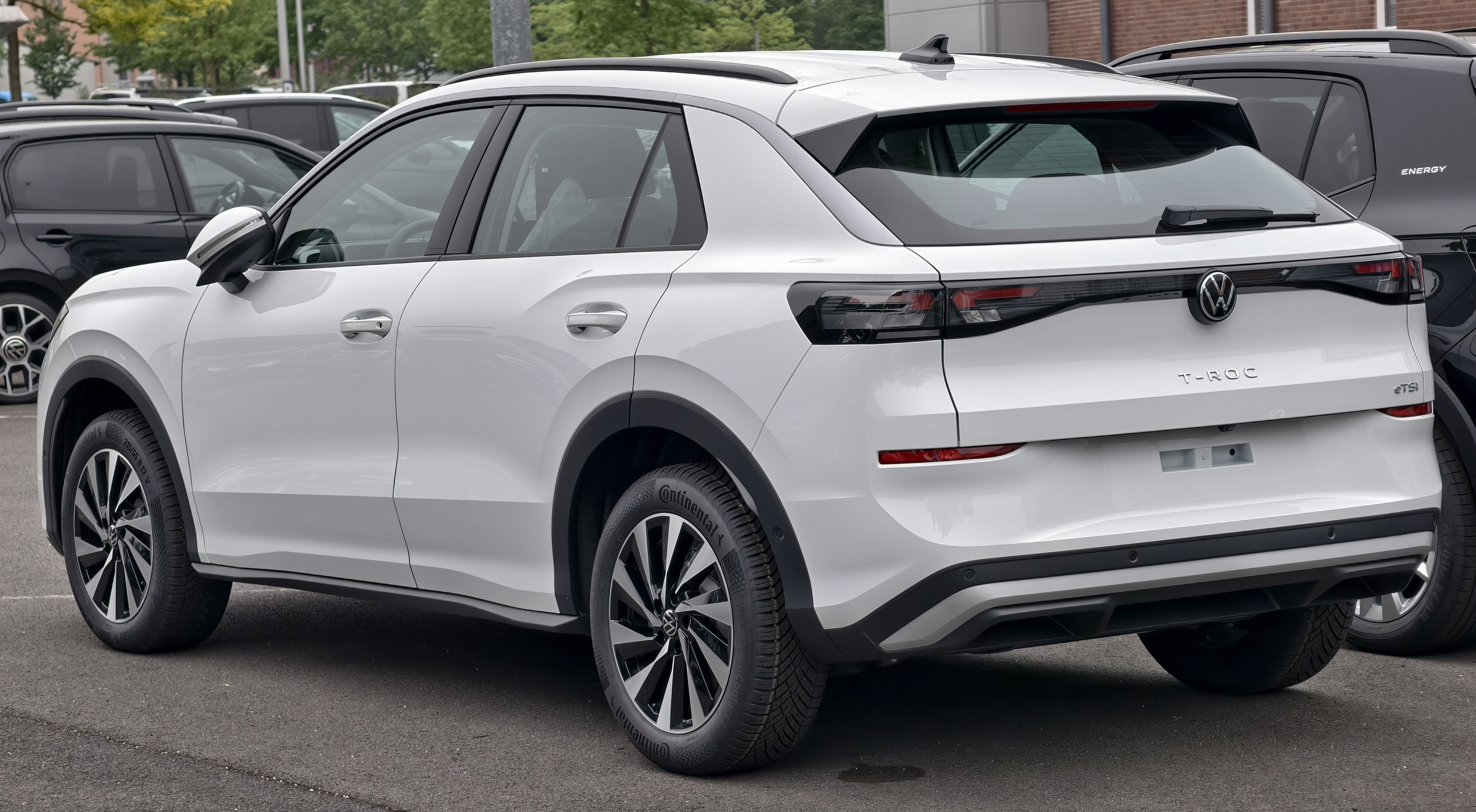
Rear view

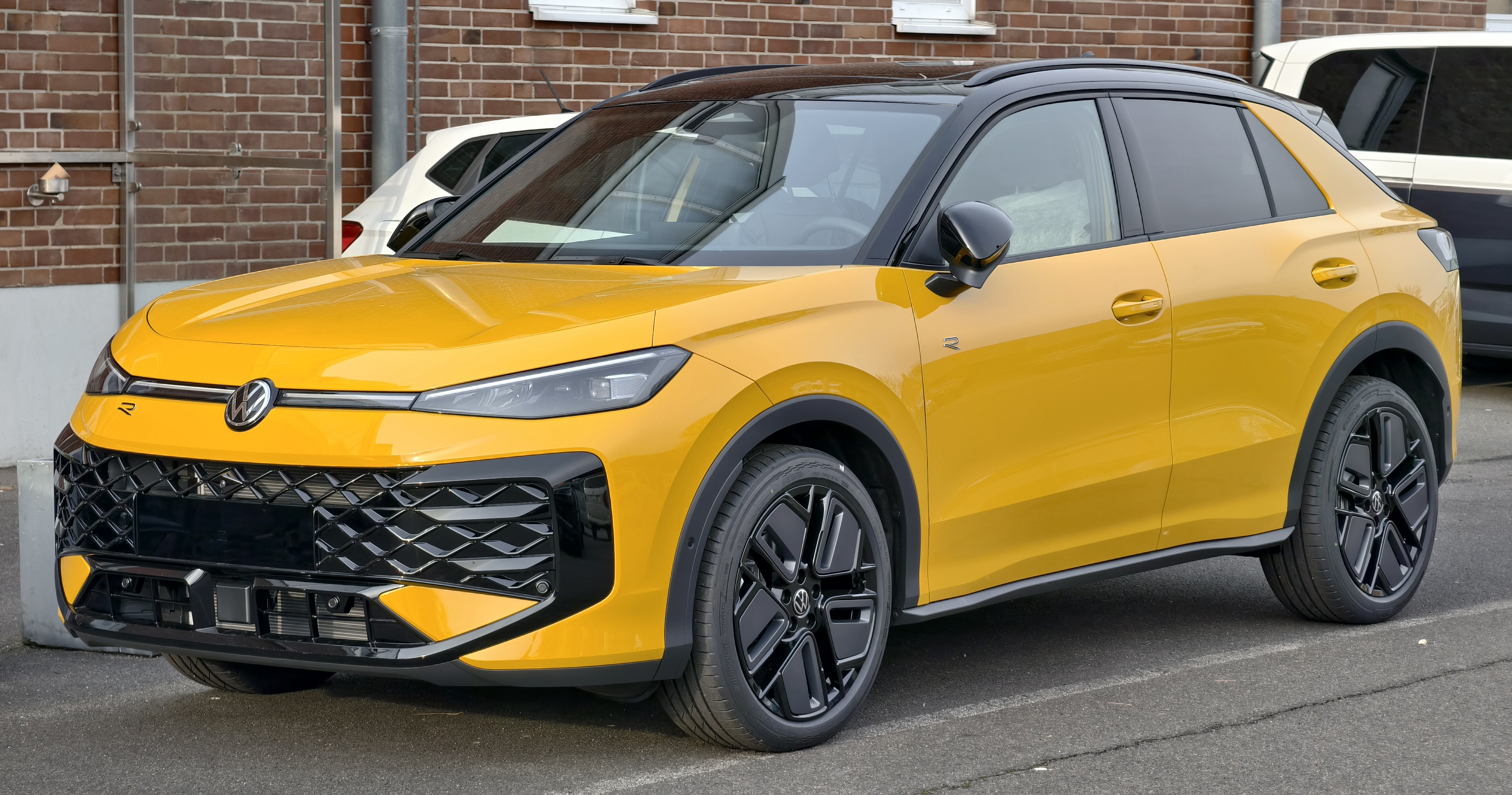
T-Roc R-Line

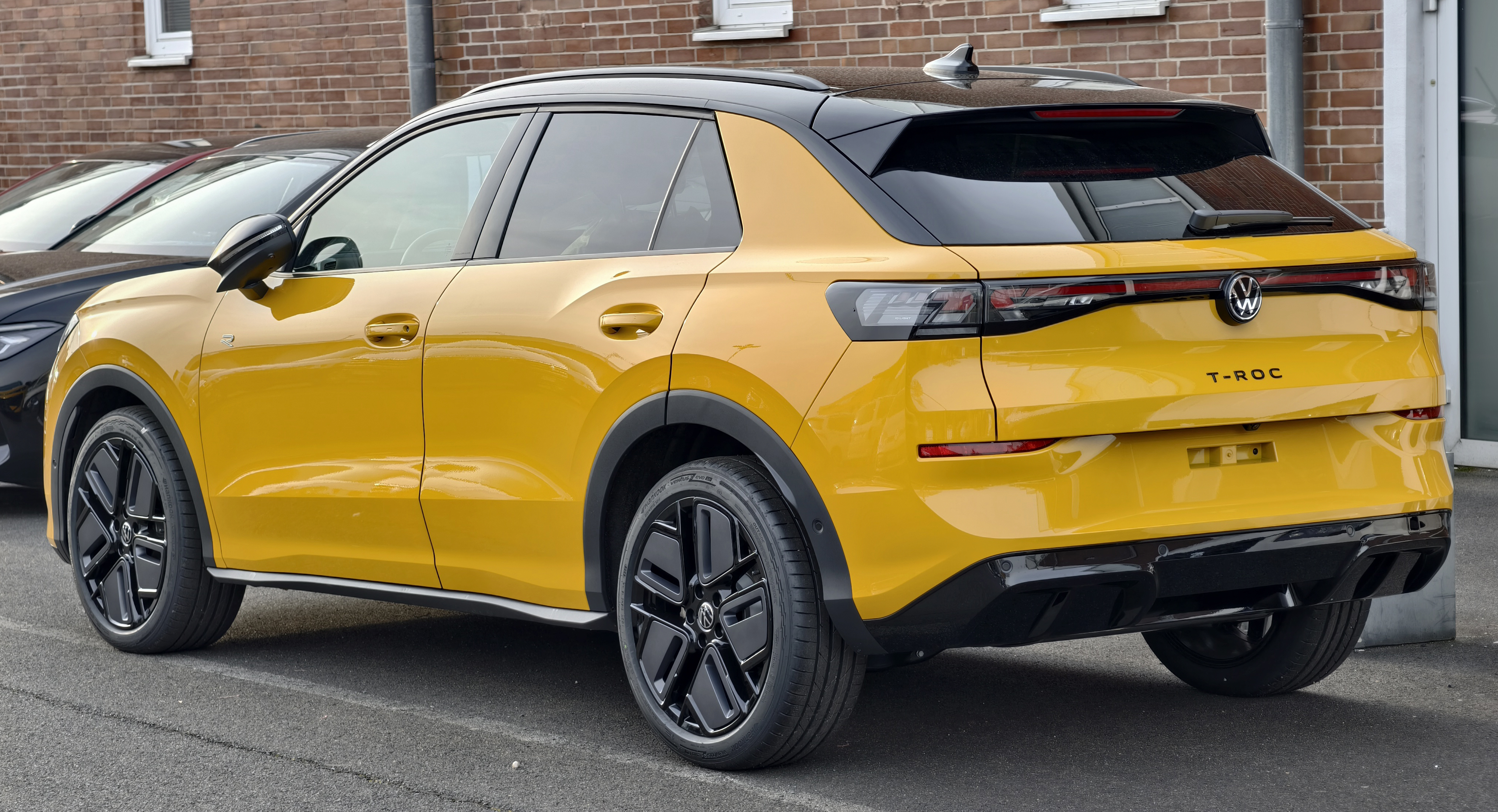
Rear view

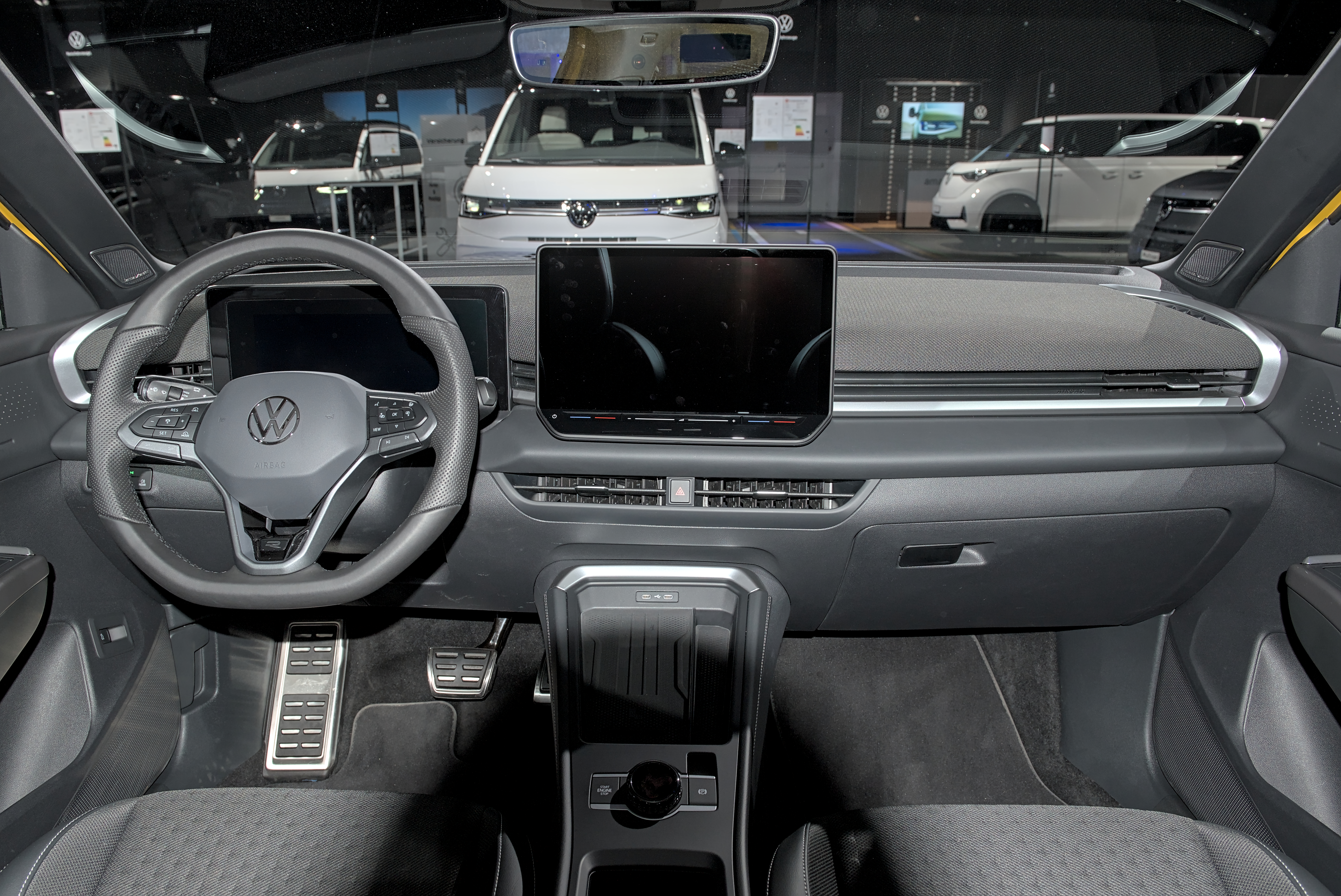
Interior

=== T-Roc R ===
A high performance version of the T-Roc was launched in 18 November 2026.

=== Safety ===
Euro NCAP test results Volkswagen T-Roc 1.5 TSI 'Life' (LHD) (2025)
Test	Points	%
Overall:	5 /5 stars	
Adult occupant:	36.7	91%
Child occupant:	43.0	87%
Pedestrian:	55.3	87%
Safety assist:	14.0	77%

== Battery electric (2028) ==
Volkswagen has announced that the T-Roc EV will be manufactured at the Wolfsburg plant alongside the next-generation Golf EV. Both models will be based on the SSP architecture and are expected to debut towards the end of the decade. The electric T-Roc will differ from its ICE-powered counterpart, which is set to enter its second generation in 2025.

== Sales ==
Year	Global (production)	Europe (Note: Europe: 2020 EU 27 + UK + Switzerland + Norway + Iceland)	Turkey	Australia	China
2017	22,724	4,930			
2018	236,977	139,755			49,342
2019	328,069	207,976			126,859
2020	285,299	158,638	8,796	1,261	109,605
2021	282,748	181,577	7,303	4,838	67,281
2022	322,211	181,153	10,116	3,627	
2023	289,426		15,587	8,943	59,798
2024					57,721
2025			22,464		50,436
