= Pillar (car) =

Vertical or near vertical support of a car's window area or greenhouse

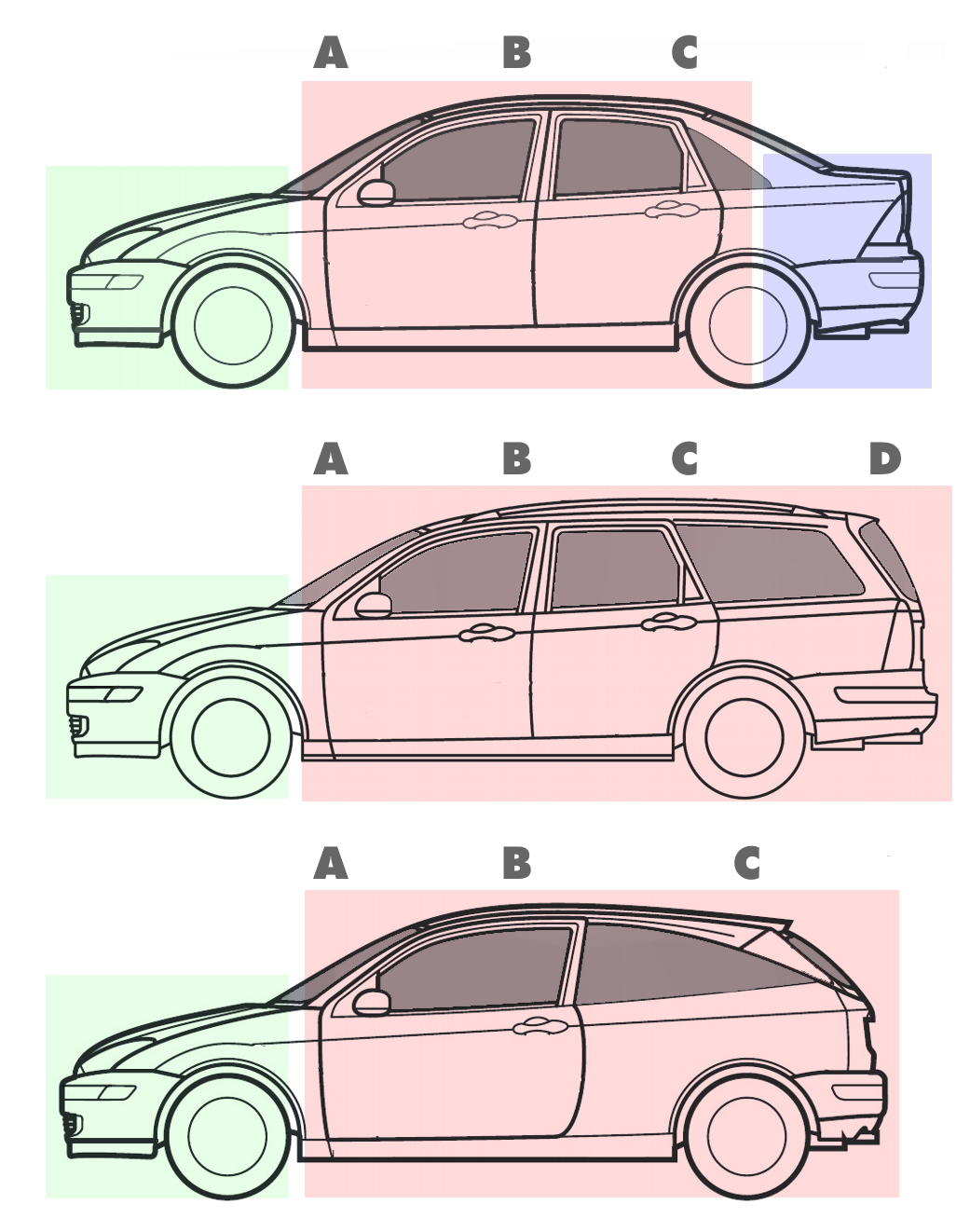
Typical pillar configurations of a first generation Ford Focus sedan (three box), station wagon (two box) and hatchback (two box) from the same model range

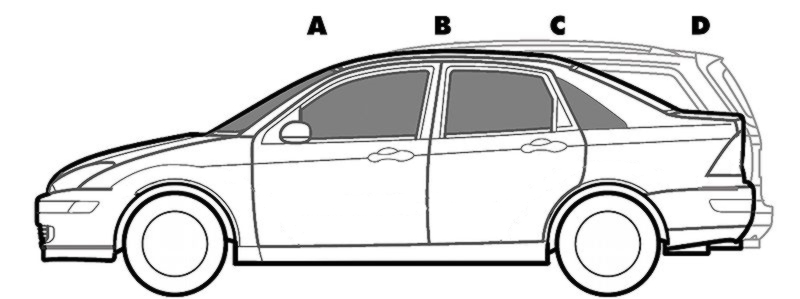
Typical pillar configurations of a sedan (three box) and station wagon (two box) from the same model range

Diagram of a five-door hatchback (two-box) superimposed over the station wagon (two-box) from the same model range—in this case, both with a D-pillar

The pillars on a car with permanent roof body style (such as four-door sedans) are the vertical or nearly vertical supports of its window area or greenhouse—designated respectively as the A, B, C and (in larger cars such as 4-door station wagons and sport utility vehicles) D-pillar, moving from front to rear, in profile view.

== Nomenclature ==
Car pillars are vertical or inclined components of an enclosed automobile's body that both support its roof and reinforce the torsional rigidity of the body.

An alphabetical convention for designating a car's pillars has developed over time, used variously by the automotive press in describing and reviewing vehicles, insurance companies in identifying damaged components, and first-responder rescue teams to facilitate communication, as when using the jaws of life to cut their way into a wreck.

The letters A, B, C, and D are used (in upper case):

- The A-pillar is the forward-most pillar on a vehicle, supporting its roof at each corner of the windshield.
- The B-pillar is located between a vehicle's front and rear side glass, where it serves as a structural support of its roof.
- The C-pillar is the rearmost on two- and four-door sedans and hatchbacks.
- The D-pillar is the rearmost pillar on larger four-door vehicles such as station wagons and full-sized SUVs.

Posts for quarter windows (a smaller typically opening window on older vehicles between the front door window and windshield, and sometimes found in the rear, usually fixed) are not considered roof pillars.

== Design ==
Body pillars are critical in providing strength to an automobile body. As the most costly body components to develop or re-tool, a vehicle's roof and door design are a major factor in meeting safety and crash standards. Before safety standards, pillars were typically thin. The design of body pillars has changed with regulations that provide roof crush protection. Standards in the United States were introduced in phases starting in 2009 that require enclosed passenger cars to be able to support from 1.5-times to 3.0-times the vehicle's unloaded weight on its roof while maintaining headroom (survival space) for occupants.

This has meant designing thicker roof pillars that not only provide sufficient strength, but that also incorporate padding and accommodate airbags. However, because thicker A-pillars can somewhat limit the driver's forward field of vision and thus create blind spots, some designs employ slimmer, chamfered A-pillars made of stronger alloy steel on each side of the windshield to help improve driver vision while still meeting safety standards and offering crash protection.

One of the important design elements of modern cars is the A-pillar because its location and angle impact the shape of the front of the car and the overall shape of modern vehicles or what designers call "volume." For example, more forward positioned A-pillars provide for increased interior room and make for less angle and visual difference between the hood and windshield. This arrangement makes the side view of a car look aerodynamic. The A-pillars that are positioned further back on a vehicle are most often found on rear-wheel drive and SUV models. This arrangement provides a greater hood to windshield angle as well as achieving a bigger field of view for the driver, but at the disadvantage of encroaching on interior space.

The center B-pillar on four-door sedans (also known as a "post") is typically a closed steel structure welded at the bottom to the car's rocker panel and floorpan, as well as on the top to the roof rail or panel. This pillar provides structural support for the vehicle's roof panel and is designed for latching the front door and mounting the hinges for the rear doors. As "perhaps the most complex of all the structures on the vehicle", the B-pillar may be a multi-layered assembly of various lengths and strengths.

B-pillars also exist as integral elements of an automobile unibody on two-door sedans and hatchbacks, separating the front door from either fixed or movable glass of the second row of seating. Additional doors beyond four, such as on limousines, will create corresponding B-pillars, numbered by order B1, B2, etc..

Closed vehicles without a B-pillar are widely called hardtops and have been available in two- or four-door body styles, in sedan, coupe, and station wagon versions. Designs without a "B" pillar for roof support behind the front doors and rear side windows offer increased occupant visibility, while in turn requiring underbody strengthening to maintain structural rigidity. The need for stronger roof structures meant replacing the pillar-less designs with a rigid B-pillar such as the two-door AMC Matador line. To continue capitalizing on the popularity of the design, General Motors attempted to broaden the definition of "hardtop" during the early 1970s to include models with a B-pillar, with the false rationale, "up to then, everybody thought a hardtop was a car without a center pillar." The "Colonnade" mid-sized General Motors models were so named because of their pillared structure designed to meet new rollover protection standards, but marketers attempted to promote them as if they were true hardtops. By the late 1970s (1978 being the last year of pillarless hardtop cars in the U.S. domestic market), the full-size Chrysler Newport and New Yorker were the last designs with opening front and rear side windows and no B-pillar.

The C-pillar is the rearmost on two- and four-door sedans and hatchbacks, and has served as an opportunity for automobile designers "to introduce a little 'design flair' to what would otherwise be a fairly nondescript side view." Most conventional C-pillars are rearward sloping, but reverse-angled have been used to differentiate their designs. Because many modern cars are similar in side view, the designs of the C-pillar have "become an area for stylistic whimsy."

Designs of the D-pillar typically found on station wagons and SUVs have also undergone a transition from function to more of a styling element. As crossover vehicles look similar, "the D-pillar is the only opportunity for any distinction."

== See also ==
- Automobile design
- Automotive head-up display
- List of auto parts
- Quarter glass
- Vehicle blind spot
