= Roof crush =

Roof crush is the failure and displacement of an automobile roof into the passenger compartment during a rollover accident.

Every year approximately 10,000 Americans are killed in rollover accidents, accounting for about 30% of all light vehicle occupant fatalities. The number of occupant injuries is significantly higher. The relationship between injury levels and intrusion or roof crush has been statistically established, but the mechanism has been thought sometimes to be somewhat obscure. Theories advocating the idea that rollover injuries are caused by the occupants "falling" or "diving" into the vehicles interior have been advanced, but the severity of these events, and thus their potential for causing injury, has been questioned.

Observations from school bus and heavy truck rollovers also suggests that the fall and dive theories are incorrect and that another theory of the mechanism of injury in rollover accidents is required, one that relates injury to the intrusion of the roof structure into the occupant compartment or more simply to "roof crush". Today it is generally realized that the primary injury mechanism in light vehicle rollover accidents is not crushing. Rather, it is widely acknowledged that the principal injury process for contained, i.e., non-ejected, occupants involves the impact between the occupant and the vehicle interior. Since the severity of an impact depends to a large extent on the relative velocity between the impacting objects; the impact theory of injury causation in rollovers has sought to explain the increase in injuries associated with increased roof crush with an increase in the relative velocity between the occupant and the vehicle's interior which is generated by the roof crush. In the simplest terms, when the occupants hits a collapsing roof, they hit harder because the roof is moving in on them. If the roof was not collapsing, and thus moving towards the occupants, their velocity relative to the roof would be lower and the impact less severe.

Roof crush has also been identified as a cause of both full and partial ejection in rollover accidents because of ejection portals created by the collapsing roof structure. These chiefly involve broken windows but occasionally also involve the body structure. The current Federal regulation involving roof strength - 49 CFR 571.216 (FMVSS 216) - has been found to offer little benefit and is currently being reviewed. Many European manufacturers provide stronger roofs than do U.S. or Asian manufacturers despite the fact that there is no European (EEC) roof strength regulation for light vehicles. The Volvo XC90 may be a good example of this.
