= Federal Motor Vehicle Safety Standards =

US federal vehicle regulations

The Federal Motor Vehicle Safety Standards (FMVSS) are U.S. federal vehicle regulations specifying design, construction, performance, and durability requirements for motor vehicles and regulated automobile safety-related components, systems, and design features. They are the U.S. counterpart to the UN Regulations developed by the World Forum for Harmonization of Vehicle Regulations and recognized to varying degree by most countries except the United States.

Canada has a system of analogous rules called the Canada Motor Vehicle Safety Standards (CMVSS), which overlap substantially but not completely in content and structure with the FMVSS.

The FMVSS/CMVSS requirements differ significantly from the international UN requirements, so private import of foreign vehicles not originally manufactured to North American specifications is difficult or impossible.

== Structure ==
FMVSS are currently codified in Title 49 of the Code of Federal Regulations, Part 571, Subpart B (49 CFR 571), with each FMVSS standard as a section of Part 571, e.g., FMVSS Standard No. 101 is 49 CFR 571.101. FMVSS are developed and enforced by the National Highway Traffic Safety Administration (NHTSA) pursuant to statutory authorization in the form of the National Traffic and Motor Vehicle Safety Act of 1966, which is now codified at 49 U.S.C. ch. 301.

FMVSS are divided into three categories: crash avoidance (100-series), crashworthiness (200-series), and post-crash survivability (300-series). The first regulation, FMVSS No. 209, was adopted on 1 March 1967 and remains in force to date though its requirements have been periodically updated and made more stringent. It stipulates the requirements for seat belts in roadgoing vehicles.

Other FMVSS include:

=== Crash avoidance ===
- FMVSS No. 101: Controls and displays
- FMVSS No. 102: Transmission shift lever sequence, starter interlock, and transmission braking effect
- FMVSS No. 103: Windshield defrosting and defogging systems
- FMVSS No. 104: Windshield wiping and washing systems
- FMVSS No. 105: Hydraulic and electric brake systems
- FMVSS No. 106: Brake hoses
- FMVSS No. 107: [Reserved] (previously "Reflecting surfaces", rescinded in 1996)
- FMVSS No. 108: Lamps, reflective device and associated equipment
- FMVSS No. 109: New pneumatic tires for passenger cars
- FMVSS No. 110: Tire selection and rims for passenger cars
- FMVSS No. 111: Rear view and side view mirrors
- FMVSS No. 112: [Reserved] (previously "Headlamp concealment devices", canceled in 1996 and incorporated into #108)
- FMVSS No. 113: Hood latch system
- FMVSS No. 114: Theft Protection
- FMVSS No. 115: [Reserved] (previously "Vehicle identification number", moved to Part 565 in 1983)
- FMVSS No. 116: Motor vehicle brake fluids
- FMVSS No. 117: Retreaded pneumatic tires
- FMVSS No. 118: Power-operated window, partition, and roof panel systems
- FMVSS No. 119: New pneumatic tires for vehicles other than passenger cars
- FMVSS No. 120: Tire selection and rims for motor vehicles other than passenger cars
- FMVSS No. 121: Air brake systems
- FMVSS No. 122: Motorcycle brake systems
- FMVSS No. 123: Motorcycle controls and displays
- FMVSS No. 124: Accelerator control systems
- FMVSS No. 125: Warning devices
- FMVSS No. 126: Electronic stability control systems
- FMVSS No. 127: Automatic Emergency Braking (AEB) (previously "Speedometers and odometers", revoked in 1982)
- FMVSS No. 128: [Reserved] (previously "Fields of direct view", rescinded in 1981)
- FMVSS No. 129: New non-pneumatic tires for passenger cars- new temporary spare non-pneumatic tires for use on passenger cars
- FMVSS No. 131: School bus pedestrian safety devices
- FMVSS No. 135: Light vehicle brake systems
- FMVSS No. 136: Electronic stability control systems on heavy vehicles
- FMVSS No. 138: Tire-pressure monitoring systems
- FMVSS No. 139: New pneumatic radial tires for light vehicles
- FMVSS No. 140: [Proposed] ("Parts and Accessories Necessary for Safe Operation; Speed Limiting Devices", released for public comment in September 2016)
- FMVSS No. 141: Minimum sound requirements for hybrid and electric vehicles

=== Crashworthiness ===
- FMVSS No. 201: Occupant protection in interior impact
- FMVSS No. 202: Head restraints for passenger vehicles
- FMVSS No. 203: Impact protection for the driver from the steering control system
- FMVSS No. 204: Steering control rearward displacement
- FMVSS No. 205: Glazing materials
- FMVSS No. 206: Door locks and door retention components
- FMVSS No. 207: Seating Systems
- FMVSS No. 208: Occupant crash protection
- FMVSS No. 209: Seat belt assemblies
- FMVSS No. 210: Seat belt anchorages
- FMVSS No. 211: [Reserved] (previously "Wheel nuts, wheel discs and hub caps")
- FMVSS No. 212: Windshield mounting
- FMVSS No. 213: Child restraint systems
- FMVSS No. 214: Side impact protection
- FMVSS No. 215: [Reserved] (previously "Exterior protection")
- FMVSS No. 216: Roof crush resistance
- FMVSS No. 217: Bus emergency exits and window retention and release.
- FMVSS No. 218: Motorcycle helmets
- FMVSS No. 219: Windshield zone intrusion
- FMVSS No. 220: School bus rollover protection
- FMVSS No. 221: School bus body joint strength
- FMVSS No. 222: School bus passenger seating and crash protection
- FMVSS No. 223: Rear impact guards
- FMVSS No. 224: Rear impact protection
- FMVSS No. 225: Child restraint anchorage systems
- FMVSS No. 226: Ejection mitigation
- FMVSS No. 227: Bus rollover structural integrity

=== Post-crash survivability ===
- FMVSS No. 301: Fuel system integrity
- FMVSS No. 302: Flammability of interior materials
- FMVSS No. 303: Fuel system integrity of compressed natural gas vehicles
- FMVSS No. 304: Compressed natural gas fuel container integrity
- FMVSS No. 305: Electric-powered vehicles: Electrolyte spillage and electrical shock protection

=== Miscellaneous ===
- FMVSS No. 401: Interior trunk release
- FMVSS No. 402: [Reserved] (previously "Radiator and coolant reservoir caps venting of motor vehicle coolant systems")
- FMVSS No. 403: Platform lift systems for motor vehicles
- FMVSS No. 404: Platform lift installation in motor vehicles
- FMVSS No. 500: Low-speed vehicles

=== Other regulations relating to transportation ===
Aside from the FMVSS in Part 571, there are numerous federal regulations pertaining to motor vehicles under Title 49, including:

- Part 523: Vehicle Classification
- Part 525: Exemptions from average fuel economy standards
- Part 526: Petitions and plans for relief under the Automobile Fuel Efficiency Act of 1980
- Part 529: Manufacturers of multistage automobiles
- Part 531: Passenger automobile average fuel economy standards
- Part 533: Light truck fuel economy standards
- Part 534: Rights and responsibilities of manufacturers in the context of changes in corporate relationships
- Part 536: Transfer and trading of fuel economy credits
- Part 537: Automotive fuel economy reports
- Part 538: Manufacturing incentives for alternative fuel vehicles
- Part 541: Federal motor vehicle theft prevention standard
- Part 542: Procedures for selecting light duty truck lines to be covered by the theft prevention standard
- Part 543: Exemption from vehicle theft prevention standard
- Part 544: Insurer reporting requirements
- Part 545: Federal motor vehicle theft prevention standard phase-in and small-volume line reporting requirements
- Part 551: Procedural rules
- Part 552: Petitions for rulemaking, defect, and noncompliance orders
- Part 553: Rulemaking procedures
- Part 554: Standards enforcement and defects investigation
- Part 555: Temporary exemptions from motor vehicle safety and bumper standards
- Part 556: Exemption for inconsequential defect or noncompliance
- Part 557: Petitions for hearings on notification and remedy of defects
- Part 563: Event data recorders
- Part 564: Replaceable light source and sealed beam headlamp information
- Part 565: Vehicle identification number requirements
- Part 566: Manufacturer identification
- Part 567: Certification
- Part 568: Vehicles manufactured in two or more stages
- Part 569: Regrooved tires
- Part 570: Vehicle-In-Use inspection standards
- Part 572: Anthropomorphic test devices
- Part 573: Defect and noncompliance responsibility and reports
- Part 574: Tire identification and record keeping
- Part 575: Consumer information
- Part 576: Record retention
- Part 577: Defect and noncompliance notification
- Part 578: Civil and criminal penalties
- Part 579: Reporting of information and communications about potential defects
- Part 580: Odometer disclosure requirements
- Part 581: Bumper standard
- Part 582: Insurance cost information regulation
- Part 583: Automobile parts content labeling
- Part 585: Phase-in reporting requirements
- Part 586: [Reserved]
- Part 587: Deformable barriers
- Part 588: Child restraint system recordkeeping requirements
- Part 589: [Reserved]
- Part 590: [Reserved]
- Part 591: Importation of vehicles and equipment subject to federal safety, bumper, and theft prevention standards
- Part 592: Registered importers of vehicles not originally manufactured to conform to the Federal Motor Vehicle Safety Standards
- Part 593: Determinations that a vehicle not originally manufactured to conform to the Federal Motor Vehicle Safety Standards is eligible for importation
- Part 594: Schedule of fees authorized by 49 U.S.C. § 30141
- Part 595: Make inoperative exemptions
- Part 596: [Reserved]
- Part 597: [Reserved]
- Part 598: [Reserved]
- Part 599: Requirements and procedures for Consumer Assistance to Recycle and Save Act Program
