= R90 =

R90 may refer to:

- ECE Regulation 90, concerning vehicle brake linings
- HMS Cheviot (R90), a destroyer of the Royal Navy
- Romano R.90, a prototype French fighter aircraft
- Ruschmeyer R 90, a German civil utility aircraft
- Toyota Noah (R90), a minivan
