= Australian Design Rules =

Vehicle regulations in Australia

The Australian Design Rules (ADRs) are the national technical regulations for vehicle safety, theft resistance, and emissions requirements in Australia. All new road vehicles manufactured in Australia and imported new or second-hand vehicles, must comply with the relevant ADRs when they are first supplied to the Australian market. The relevant State or Territory government legislation generally requires that it complies with the relevant ADRs as at the time of manufacture. The ADRs are largely based on and actively harmonised with the UN vehicle and equipment regulations. An ADR may directly specify technical and performance requirements, as well as allow alternative standards to be met instead. The alternative standards are typically the same UNECE regulations as those directly specified. Most ADRs have been fully harmonised with UNECE regulations, meaning that a manufacturer only needs to provide evidence of a UNECE approval, or a valid test to the requirements of a regulation, in order to demonstrate compliance with an ADR.

Those ADRs that are only partially harmonised with UNECE Regulations require additional Australian requirements that must also be met. Where an ADR is harmonised, the base text of the UNECE regulation forms the main text of the ADR.

Fully harmonised ADRs use the technical requirements of the ECE Regulations and approvals issued by UN ECE signatory countries demonstrating compliance with the UN ECE Regulation. There is no UN ECE whole of vehicle approval process (unlike the EU's EEC system). Instead, the ADRs are administered by requiring manufacturers to submit evidence of compliance either by tests results or an UN ECE Approval certificate where applicable. Once satisfactory evidence of compliance is submitted and accepted for a vehicle "type" a type approval to supply is issued allowing the manufacture to add complying vehicles' VINs to the Registrer of Approved Vehicles (RAV). The manufacturer can now affix a "compliance plate" stating the vehicle's specifications and parameters, build date, identification number, and other required information along with a statement to the effect that the vehicle complies with all applicable ADRs.

Vehicles not built to comply with the ADRs are generally barred from import to Australia unless they are brought into compliance with applicable ADRs and the conversion work is inspected and certified by an authorised compliance engineer.

As of 2024, the standards are the Third Edition ADRs, introduced in July 1989. Since 1 July 2021, they have been administered by The Department of Infrastructure, Transport, Regional Development, Communications and the Arts under the Road Vehicle Standards Act 2018 (RVSA). From July 1989 until 1 July 2021, they were administered by the department under the Motor Vehicle Standards Act 1989 (MVSA).

== Development ==
The First Edition ADRs were only distributed for discussion and were not adopted as a legally binding set of Standards under either National or State/Territory law. The Second Edition ADRs came into effect on 1 January 1969 and were selectively applied under State/Territory law. They only applied to vehicles manufactured from 1 January 1969 onwards. The Third Edition ADRs became effective from 1 July 1988. In a transition period between 1 July 1988 and July 1989, the Second Edition ADRs were increasingly superseded by the Third Edition ADRs. They were made National Standards by 1 September 1989.

The Third Edition ADRs were initially a combination of active Second Edition ADRs, amendments made in the interim after they were first published, and requirements for aspects not requiringf complex tests (such as vehicle length) imposed by State and Territory governments as in-use requirements (collectively collated into the Consolidated Draft Regulations). Amendments were made to ensure relevance, and new ADRs were added to cover new developments in road vehicle manufacturing and technology.

The application of ADRs for vehicles manufactured up until July 1989 is the responsibility of the State and Territory governments.
