= Federal Motor Vehicle Safety Standard 106 =

Federal Motor Vehicle Safety Standard

Federal Motor Vehicle Safety Standard 106 (FMVSS 106) regulates motor vehicle brake hoses and related assemblies and fittings in the United States. Like all other Federal Motor Vehicle Safety Standards, FMVSS 106 is administered by the United States Department of Transportation's National Highway Traffic Safety Administration.

This standard specifies requirements for labeling and performance requirements for motor vehicle brake hoses, brake hose assemblies, and brake hose end fittings. The purpose of this standard is to reduce deaths and injuries occurring as a result of brake system failure from pressure or vacuum loss due to hose or hose assembly and plastic tubing or plastic tubing assembly rupture. The requirements apply to passenger cars, multi-purpose passenger vehicles, trucks, buses, trailers, and motorcycles, and to hydraulic, air, vacuum brake hose, plastic air brake tubing, brake hose and plastic air brake tubing assemblies, and brake hose and plastic air brake tubing end fittings for use in those vehicles.

== See also ==
- Federal Motor Vehicle Safety Standards
