= Title 49 CFR Part 600 - 699 =

CFR Title 49, Parts 600 thru 699 - Federal Transit Administration (FTA) is one of twelve chapters comprising the United States Code of Federal Regulations (CFR), Title 49, consisting of a unified body of regulations applying to specific functions and activities under the control of the FTA. This chapter itself consists of 20 parts covering FTA organization, functions and procedures for its offices and programs.

== Notable programs ==
The Federal Transit Administration (FTA) thru its major programs provides financial and technical assistance to local public transit systems.

== Part 611— Major capital investment projects ==
This is FTA's primary grant program for funding major transit capital investments, including rapid rail, light rail, bus rapid transit, commuter rail, and ferries. This CFR part prescribes the process that applicants must follow to be considered eligible for fixed guideway capital investment grants known as New Starts and Small Starts as well as the procedures used by FTA to evaluate and rate proposed candidate projects.

== See also ==
- Title 49 of the Code of Federal Regulations
