= Federal Motor Vehicle Safety Standard 401 =

Federal Motor Vehicle Safety Standard

Federal Motor Vehicle Safety Standard 401 (FMVSS 401) is an American standard that establishes the requirement for providing a trunk release mechanism which allows a person trapped inside the trunk compartment of a passenger car to escape. This standard does not apply to vehicles with a hinged back door found on hatchbacks and station wagons. Like all other Federal Motor Vehicle Safety Standards, FMVSS 401 is administered by the United States Department of Transportation's National Highway Traffic Safety Administration.

This standard specifies requirements for passenger cars that have trunk compartments be equipped with an interior trunk release making it possible for a trapped person to escape from the compartment. The release can be either manual or automatic. If manual, it must be visible from inside the closed trunk and if automatic it must unlatch within five minutes of trunk closure.

== See also ==
- Federal Motor Vehicle Safety Standards
