= Vehicle regulation =

Requirements automobiles must satisfy to be approved

Vehicle regulations are requirements that automobiles must satisfy in order to be approved for sale or use in a particular country or region. They are usually mandated by legislation, and administered by a government body. The regulations concern aspects such as lighting, controls, crashworthiness, environment protection and theft protection, and might include safety belts or automated features.

Government regulation in the automotive industry directly affects the way cars look, how their components are designed, the safety features that are included, and the overall performance of any given vehicle. As a result, these regulations also have a significant effect on the automotive business by generally increasing production costs while also placing limitations on how cars are sold and marketed. Automotive regulations are designed to benefit the consumer and protect the environment, and automakers can face stiff fines and other penalties if they are not followed.

— investopedia,

== History ==
Some countries have had national regulations for a long time. The first steps toward harmonizing vehicle regulations internationally were made in 1952 when WP.29, a working party of experts on vehicles' technical requirements, was created. This resulted in the 1958 Agreement on uniform conditions of approval and mutual recognition of vehicle approvals, components, and parts. This was one of the first international agreements on vehicle regulation, which initially focused on European countries. The European Union played a role in harmonizing regulations between member states. Later, the 1958 agreement was opened to non-European countries such as Japan, Korea, and Australia.

To join the WP.29, one has to send a letter signed by an important official from their country or regional economic integration organization (REIO) informing the secretariat of WP.29 that they would like to participate in meetings regarding the harmonization of vehicle regulations (United Nations). The next step to participate would be to get the registration form completed by delegates who are also attending the meeting. Other parties such as Non-Governmental Organizations (NGOs) must be of certified advisory status to the Economic and Social Council of the United Nations (ECOSOC).

There was a new international agreement in 1998 whose objectives were to improve global safety, decrease environmental pollution and consumption of energy and improve anti‐theft performance of vehicles and related components and equipment through establishing global technical regulations (GTRs) in a Global Registry based on UNECE Regulations or national regulations listed in a Compendium of candidates, GTR harmonizing them at the highest level. In 2000, WP.29 became the World Forum for Harmonization of Vehicle Regulations that is a working party of the United Nations Economic Commission for Europe (UNECE).

In 1947 the United Nations Economic Commission for Europe (UNECE) was established to reconstruct Europe after the war took place, expand profitable activity, and nourish relationships between European countries and the rest of the nation. With the help of UNECE, it is used as policy dialogue, economic dialogue, and assist countries in their intermingling into the global economy. UNECE attempts to maintain amicable relationships amongst other countries involving transport, trade, statistics, energy, forestry, housing, and land management (UN. ECE). UNECE is multisector that is a tool used to tackle hardships that may arise providing solutions when possible.

== Geographical regulations ==
- International
  - United Nations has a World Forum for Harmonization of Vehicle Regulations related to three vehicle agreements.
    - 1998 agreement, global agreement including 38 countries: (Global Technical Regulations). In the parties are Japan, Australia, Korea, Russia, European Union, United Kingdom, Canada, China, South Africa and the US.
    - 1958 agreement, regional agreement including 58 parties: ECE (United Nations Economic Commission for Europe). In the parties are Japan, Australia, Korea, Russia and the European Union and United Kingdom.
- Regional agreements and regulations
  - European Union is a single market with the European Economic Area with laws named EU directive or regulation EU regulations which make some UNECE regulations applicable at a given date in its 27 member states.
  - NAFTA binds Canada, the US, and Mexico to some safety regulations.
- National
  - United States: FMVSS (administered by the U.S. National Highway Traffic Safety Administration (NHTSA), which also administers the Corporate Average Fuel Economy (CAFE) standard)
  - Canada: CMVSS
  - China: Guobiao standards
  - South Korea: KMVSS
  - Australia: ADR (Australian Design Rules) Australia applies some UNECE regulation such as regulation 16 and some FMVS 209 regulation.
  - Japan: Test Requirements and Instructions for Automobile Standards. As a member of both the 1958 and the 1998 agreement Japan applies 64 regulations from those two set of regulations.
  - India: AIS (Automotive Industry Standards), BSES (Bharat stage emission standards)
  - United Kingdom: inherited EU laws and might comply with some UNECE regulations
- Provincial/State
  - California state, United States: CARB (California Air Resources Board)

== Table of regulations ==
=== Global regulations and their relation with national / regional law ===
Status of the Agreement, of the Global Registry and of the Compendium of Candidates, Revision 31, UNECE, 16 november2021
Global regulation number	Global regulation title	Australia	Canada	PRC	EU	India	Japan	Russia	US
1	Door locks and door retention components	into national law	into national law		Transposition; UN Regulation No.11		into national law	Transposition; UN Regulation No.11	Transposition
1 Am 1	Door locks and door retention components				Transposition; UN Regulation No.11		Transposition; UN Regulation No.11		Transposition
2	Measurement procedure for two-wheeled motorcycles (...) with regard to the emission of gaseous pollutants, CO 2 emissions and fuel consumption				Regional law				
3	Motorcycle brake systems		Transposition; UN Regulation No.78		Transposition; UN Regulation No.78		into national law	Transposition; UN Regulation No.78	Transposition
4	(...) natural gas (NG) or liquefied petroleum gas (LPG) (...) the emission of pollutants (WHDC)				Transposition; UN Regulation No.49			Transposition; UN Regulation No.49	
5	on-board diagnostic systems (OBD) for road vehicles				Transposition; UN Regulation No.49			Transposition; UN Regulation No.49	
6	Safety glazing				Transposition; UN Regulation No.43			Transposition; UN Regulation No.43	
7	Head restraints								
8	Electronic stability control systems	into national law with amendments and exemptions	transposed into national law with amendments and exemptions		Transposition; UN Regulation No.13-H			Transposition; UN Regulation No.13-H	
9	Pedestrian safety				Regional law		into national law	into national law	
9 Am 1	Pedestrian safety				Transposition; UN Regulation No.127			National law	
10	Off-cycle emissions (OCE)				Transposition; UN Regulation No.49				
11	(...) agricultural and forestry tractors (...) emissions of pollutants by the engine				Transposition; UN Regulation No.96		into national law with amendments		
12	Location, identification and operation of motorcycle controls, tell-tales and indicators				Transposition; UN Regulation No.60				
13	hydrogen and fuel cell vehicles								
14	Pole Side Impact								
15	Worldwide harmonized Light vehicles Test Procedure (WLTP)								
16	Tyres								
17	Crankcase and evaporative emissions of L-category vehicles								
18	On-Board Diagnostic (OBD) systems for L-category vehicles								
19	EVAPorative emission test procedure for the Worldwide harmonized Light vehicle Test Procedure (WLTP EVAP)								
20	Electric Vehicle Safety (EVS)								
21	Determination of Electrified Vehicle Power (DEVP)								
22	-vehicle Battery Durability for Electrified Light-Duty Vehicles								
24	Laboratory Measurement of Brake Emissions for Light-Duty Vehicles								

A new global technical regulation has also been proposed based on the accepted Proposal to develop a new UN GTR on Automated Driving Systems submitted by the representatives of Canada, China, the European Union, Japan, the United Kingdom of Great Britain and Northern Ireland and the United States of America for the generation of the draft UN Global Technical Regulation on ADS. In 2024, this regulation is still under development.

=== Specific national / regional regulations ===
	UNECE Europe and EU laws	(United States) USA	(United Nations) Global	India	Japan	China	South Korea	Australia	(Cooperation Council for the Arab States of the Gulf) Gulf
Doors	UN R11	FMVSS 206	GTR 1	IS 14225					GSO 419/1994, GSO 420/1994
Steering wheel	UN R12	FMVSS 203, FMVSS 204		AIS-096		GB 11557-2011			
Seat belts	UN R14	FMVSS 209		AIS-015					GSO 96/1988, GSO 97/1988
Child restraint system	UN R44, R129	FMVSS 213		AIS-072	JIS D 040122000	GB 14166-2013	KMVSS 103-2	AS/NZS 1754:2013; AS/NZS 3629:2013	GSO 1709/2005, GSO 1710/2005
Head restraints	UN R17	FMVSS 202a	GTR 7	IS 15546					GSO 1598/2002
Seats	UN R17, UN R80			AIS-016, AIS-023					
Occupant head impact	UN R21	FMVSS 201		IS 15223	Art. 20	GB 11552-2009	KMVSS 88	ADR 21	
Rear impact	UN R32, UN R34	FMVSS 202a, FMVSS 301		AIS-101	Art. 15‐J017‐01	GB 20072-2006			GSO 37/2012
Bumper impact	UN R42	FMVSS 581		AIS-006		GB 17354-1998			GSO 41/2007
Side windows	UN R43	FMVSS 205, FMVSS 226	GTR 6						
Rollover		FMVSS 208							
Roof strength	UN R66	FMVSS 216, FMVSS 216a		AIS-031		GB 26134-2010			GSO 39/2005
Offset frontal impact	UN R94	FMVSS 208		AIS-098	Art. 18	GB/T 20913-2007	KMVSS 102	ADR 73/00	GSO 36/2005
Side impact - moving barrier	UN R95	FMVSS 214	GTR 14	AIS-099	Art. 18 Attachmt. 24	GB 20071-2006	KMVSS 102	ADR 72/00	GSO 1707/2005, GSO 1708/2005
Pedestrian protection	UN R127, EC R78/2009, EC R631/2009		GTR 9	AIS-100	Art. 18 Attachmt. 99	GB/T 24550-2009	KMVSS 102-2		
Side pole impact	UN R135	FMVSS 214	GTR 14		Art. 18	GB/T 37337/2019	KMVSS 102-4	ADR 85/00	
Side door intrusion / Side door strength		FMVSS 214		IS 12009				ADR 29/00	GSO 38/2005
Full frontal impact	UN R137	FMVSS 208		AIS-096	Art. 18 Attachmt. 23	GB 11551-2014	KMVSS 102-3	ADR 69/00	GSO 36/2005
Sleeper coaches				AIS-119					
Vehicle interior noise	(proposal)	49 CFR 393.94		IS-12832					
Vehicle exterior noise (noise pollution)	UN R9, UN R41, UN R51, UN R63	40 CFR 205.52		Environment (Protection) Amendment Rules					
Electric vehicle warning sounds (AVAS)	Regulation 540/2014, UN R138	FMVSS 141							
Motorcycle helmets	UN R22	FMVSS 218		IS 4151	JIS T 8133:2000			AS/NZS 1698	
Automotive lights		FMVSS 108							
Front underrun protection	UN R93			AIS-069					
Rear underrun protection	UN R58	FMVSS 223, FMVSS 224		IS 14812					
Lateral protection devices	UN R73			IS 14682					
Truck cabs	UN R29			AIS-029					
ABS	UN R8 (motorcycles)								
Speed limitation	UN R89								
Airbag	UN 114 & UN R94	FMVSS 208							
Replacement wheels	UN R124								
ESC	UN R140	FMVSS 126						ADR 88/00	
TPMS	UN R141	FMVSS 138							
AECS (eCall)	UN R144								
Blind Spot Information System	UN R151								
AEB	UN R152, UN R131							ADR 98/01	
ALKS	UN R157								

=== Other shared regulations ===
==== UNECE regulations ====
Countries participating in the (1958 agreement) World Forum for Harmonization of Vehicle Regulations

Japan applies and is a member of the following UNECE regulations

- 3, approval of retro-reflecting devices for power-driven vehicles and their trailers
- 4, illumination of rear registration plates of power-driven vehicles and their trailers
- 6, approval of direction indicators for power-driven vehicles and their trailers
- 7, front and rear position lamps, stop-lamps and end-outline marker lamps for motor vehicles and their trailers
- 10, electromagnetic compatibility
- 11, door latches and door retention components
- 12, protection of the driver against the steering mechanism in the event of impact
- 13, braking
- 14, safety-belt anchorages
- 16, various safety belt related considerations
- 17, seats, their anchorages and any head restraints
- 19, front fog lamps
- 21, interior fittings
- 23, reversing and manoeuvring lamps for power-driven vehicles and their trailers
- 25, head restraints (headrests), whether or not incorporated in vehicle seats
- 26, external projections
- 27, advance-warning triangles
- 28, audible warning devices and of motor vehicles with regard to their audible warning signals
- 30, pneumatic tyres for motor vehicles and their trailers
- 34, prevention of fire risks
- 37, filament light sources for use in approved lamps of power-driven vehicles and of their trailers
- 38, rear fog lamps for power-driven vehicles and their trailers
- 39, speedometer and odometer equipment including its installation
- 41, motor cycles with regard to noise
- 43, safety glazing materials and their installation on vehicles
- 44, Child Restraint Systems
- 45, headlamp cleaners, and of power-driven vehicles with regard to headlamp cleaners
- 46, devices for indirect vision and of motor vehicles with regard to the installation of these devices
- 48, installation of lighting and light-signalling devices
- 50, front position lamps, rear position lamps, stop lamps, direction indicators and rear-registration-plate illuminating devices for vehicles of category L
- 51, motor vehicles having at least four wheels with regard to their sound emissions
- 54, pneumatic tyres for commercial vehicles and their trailers
- 58, Rear underrun ...
- 60, two-wheeled motor cycles and mopeds with regard to driver-operated controls including the identification of controls, tell-tales and indicators
- 62, power-driven vehicles with handlebars with regard to their protection against unauthorized use
- 64, vehicles with regard to their equipment which may include: a temporary use spare unit, run flat tyres and/or a run flat system and/or extended mobility tyres
- 66, large passenger vehicles with regard to the strength of their superstructure
- 70, rear marking plates for heavy and long vehicles
- 75, pneumatic tyres for L-category vehicles
- 77, parking lamps for power-driven vehicles
- 78, vehicles of categories L1, L2, L3, L4 and L5 with regard to braking
- 79, steering equipment
- 80, seats of large passenger vehicles and of these vehicles with regard to the strength of the seats and their anchorages
- 81, rear-view mirrors of two-wheeled power-driven vehicles
- 85, internal combustion engines or electric drive trains intended for the propulsion of motor vehicles of categories M and N with regard to the measurement of the net power and the maximum 30 minutes power of electric drive trains

==== OECD regulations ====
European union follows OECD regulations for tractors, for instance:

- code 6: structures de protection montées à l'avant des tracteurs agricoles et forestiers [à voie étroite,
- code 7: structures de protection montées à l'arrière des tracteurs agricoles et forestiers à voie étroite.

=== Bilateral agreements ===
Some trade agreements such as the EU-South Korea Free Trade Agreement may contain reference to a matching mapping of local requirements, for instance such mappings exists in appendix 2-C of the EU-South Korea Free Trade Agreement.

== Example of differences ==
Vehicles meeting EU standards offer reduced risk of serious injury in frontal/side crashes and have driver‐side mirrors that reduce risk in lane-change crashes better, while vehicles meeting US standards provide a lower risk of injury in rollovers and have headlamps that make pedestrians more conspicuous.

— Carol A. Flannagan, Andrée Bélint, ..., Comparing motor-vehicle crash risk of EU and US vehicles, 1 January 2015

== See also ==
- FMVSS
