= World Forum for Harmonization of Vehicle Regulations =

Working party

World Forum for Harmonization of Vehicle Regulations (WP.29)
- Abbreviation: WP.29
- Formation: 1952
- Type: Working Party
- Legal status: Active
- Head: (Italy) Antonio Erario (2021–)
- Parent organization: UNECE Inland Transport Committee
- Website: UNECE Transport - WP29

The World Forum for Harmonization of Vehicle Regulations is a working party (WP.29) of the Inland Transport Committee (ITC) of the United Nations Economic Commission for Europe (UNECE). Its responsibility is to manage the multilateral Agreements signed in 1958, 1997 and 1998 concerning the technical prescriptions for the construction, approval of wheeled vehicles as well as their Periodic Technical Inspection and, to operate within the framework of these three Agreements to develop and amend UN Regulations, UN Global Technical Regulations and UN Rules, kind of vehicle regulation.

WP.29 was established in June 1952 as the "Working Party of experts on technical requirement of vehicles", while its current name was adopted in 2000.

At its inception, WP.29 had a broader European scope. Since 2000, the global scope of this forum was recognized given the active participation of Countries in all continents, excluding the United States and Canada, who developed incompatible standards.

The forum works on regulations covering vehicle safety, environmental protection, energy efficiency and theft-resistance.

This work affects de facto vehicle design and facilitates international trade.

== Organization ==
There are six permanent Working Parties which are subsidiary bodies that consider specialized tasks, consisting of people with a specific expertise:

- Noise and Tyres (GRBP)
- Lighting and Light-Signalling (GRE)
- Pollution and Energy (GRPE)
- Automated and Connected Vehicles (GRVA)
- General Safety Provisions (GRSG)
- Passive Safety (GRSP)

== 1958 Agreement ==
The core of the Forum's work is based around the "1958 Agreement", formally titled "Agreement concerning the adoption of uniform technical prescriptions for wheeled vehicles, equipment and parts which can be fitted and/or be used on wheeled vehicles and the conditions for reciprocal recognition of approvals granted on the basis of these prescriptions" (E/ECE/TRANS/505/Rev.2, amended on 16 October 1995). This forms a legal framework wherein participating countries (contracting parties) agree on a common set of technical prescriptions and protocols for type approval of vehicles and components. These were formerly called "UNECE Regulations" or, less formally, "ECE Regulations" in reference to the Economic Commission for Europe. However, since many non-European countries are now contracting parties to the 1958 Agreement, the regulations are officially entitled "UN Regulations". According to the mutual recognition principle set in the Agreement, each Contracting Party's Type Approvals are recognised by all other Contracting Parties.

=== Participating countries ===

Formally signing the 1958 Agreement was possible till June 30 of that year, and five countries chose to do so: Italy (March 28), Netherlands (March 30), West Germany (June 19), France (June 26), and Hungary (June 30). Sweden and Belgium acceded soon after. Originally, the agreement allowed participation of ECE member countries only, but in 1995 the agreement was revised to allow non-ECE members to participate. Current participants include the European Union and its member countries, as well as non-EU UNECE members such as Norway, Russia, Ukraine, Serbia, Belarus, Kazakhstan, Turkey and Azerbaijan, and even remote territories such as South Africa, Australia, New Zealand, Japan, South Korea, Thailand and Malaysia.

Contracting parties to the 1958 Agreement are referenced by a Distinguishing Number, historically corresponding to the chronological order in which the country joined it or the UNECE AERT Agreement (1970). As of 2024, the participants of the Agreement, with their Distinguishing Number, were:

D. #	Country	Effective date	Notes
1	Germany	28 January 1965	
2	France	20 June 1959	
3	Italy	26 April 1963	
4	Netherlands	29 August 1960	
5	Sweden	20 June 1959	
6	Belgium	5 September 1959	
7	Hungary	2 July 1960	
8	Czech Republic	1 January 1993	previously Czechoslovakia
9	Spain	10 October 1961	
10	Serbia	12 March 2001	previously Yugoslavia
11	United Kingdom	16 March 1963	
12	Austria	11 May 1971	
13	Luxembourg	12 December 1971	
14	Switzerland	28 August 1973	
15	(vacant, was GDR)	4 October 1974	acceded to Germany
16	Norway	4 April 1975	
17	Finland	17 September 1976	
18	Denmark	20 December 1976	
19	Romania	21 February 1977	
20	Poland	13 March 1979	
21	Portugal	28 March 1980	
22	Russian Federation	17 February 1987	previously USSR
23	Greece	5 December 1992	
24	Ireland	24 March 1998	as an EU member
25	Croatia	8 October 1991	
26	Slovenia	25 June 1991	
27	Slovakia	1 January 1993	
28	Belarus	2 July 1995	
29	Estonia	1 May 1995	
30	Republic of Moldova	20 November 2016	
31	Bosnia and Herzegovina	6 March 1992	
32	Latvia	18 January 1999	
33	(vacant)		AETR # for Liechtenstein †
34	Bulgaria	21 January 2000	
35	Kazakhstan	8 January 2011	
36	Lithuania	29 March 2002	
37	Turkey	27 February 1996	
38	(vacant)		AETR # for Turkmenistan †
39	Azerbaijan	14 June 2002	
40	North Macedonia	17 November 1991	
41	Andorra	11 April 2023	
42	European Union	24 March 1998	
43	Japan	24 November 1998	
44	(vacant)		AETR # for Uzbekistan †
45	Australia	25 April 2000	
46	Ukraine	30 June 2000	
47	South Africa	17 June 2001	
48	New Zealand	26 January 2002	
49	Cyprus	1 May 2004	
50	Malta	1 May 2004	
51	South Korea	31 December 2004	
52	Malaysia	4 April 2006	
53	Thailand	1 May 2006	
54	Albania	5 November 2011	
55	Armenia	30 April 2018	
56	Montenegro	3 June 2006	
57	San Marino	26 January 2016	
58	Tunisia	1 January 2008	
59	(vacant)		AETR # for Monaco †
60	Georgia	25 May 2015	
61	(vacant)		unassigned AETR # †
62	Egypt	3 February 2013	
63	Nigeria	18 October 2018	
64	Pakistan	24 April 2020	
65	Uganda	22 October 2022	
66	Philippines	2 January 2023	
67	Viet Nam	26 July 2023	
68	Kyrgyzstan	1 September 2023	
(TBD)	(vacant)		AETR # for Israel †
70	Cambodia	April 2026	

† "In order to ensure in the future conformity between conventional signs in the 1958 Agreement and those set up in the [1970] AETR Agreement new Contracting Parties should be allocated the same number in both Agreements."

‡ "European Union...Approvals are granted by its Member States using their respective ECE symbol"

Most countries, even if not formally participating in the 1958 agreement, recognise the UN Regulations and either mirror the UN Regulations' content in their own national requirements, or permit the import, registration, and use of UN type-approved vehicles, or both. The United States and Canada (apart from Lighting Regulations) are the two significant exceptions; the UN Regulations are generally not recognised and UN-compliant vehicles and equipment are not authorised for import, sale, or use in the two regions, unless they are tested to be compliant with the region's car safety laws, or for limited non driving use (e.g. car show displays).

=== Type approval, e-Mark, E-Mark ===
Two types of approval marks: Top - according to UN regulations, Bottom - according to EU regulations or directives.

The 1958 Agreement operates on the principles of type approval and reciprocal recognition. Any country that accedes to the 1958 Agreement has authority to test and approve any manufacturer's design of a regulated product, regardless of the country in which that component was produced. Each individual design from each individual manufacturer is counted as one individual type. Once any acceding country grants a type approval, every other acceding country is obliged to honor that type approval and regard that vehicle or item of motor vehicle equipment as legal for import, sale and use.

Items type-approved according to a UN Regulation are marked with an E and the country's Distinguishing Number, within a circle. A capital (E) in a circle indicates compliance with a UN regulation, while a lower case [e] in a box indicates compliance with a EU directive (e.g. issued by EC, EU). This number indicates which country approved the item, and other surrounding letters and digits indicate the precise version of the regulation met and the type approval number, respectively.

Although all countries' type approvals are legally equivalent, there are real and perceived differences in the rigour with which the regulations and protocols are applied by different national type approval authorities. Some countries have their own national standards for granting type approvals, which may be more stringent than called for by the UN regulations themselves. Within the auto parts industry, a German (E1) type approval, for example, is regarded as a measure of insurance against suspicion of poor quality or an undeserved type approval.

=== UN Regulations ===
As of 2026, there are over 170 UN Regulations appended to the 1958 Agreement; most regulations cover a single vehicle component or technology. A list of current regulations applying to passenger cars follows, with regulations specific to heavy vehicles, motorcycles, tractors, etc. grouped separately.

The European Union also applies other UNECE regulations for cars produced in unlimited series, and also applies its own (non-UNECE) regulations such as European Community regulations. Regulation 0 "International Whole Vehicle Type Approval (IWVTA)" was recently introduced to define international compliance to a set of regulations.

UN REGULATIONS: Sequenced 0 Thru 172
  - R0 — International Whole Vehicle Type Approval (IWVTA)
  - R1 & 2 — Headlamps: 1 Motor vehicle (including R2 and/or HS1 lamps); 2 Incandescent electric lamps
  - R3 — Retro-reflecting devices
  - R4 — Illumination of rear registration plates
  - R5 — Sealed Beam headlamps
  - R6 — Direction indicators
  - R7 — Position, stop and end-outline lamps
  - R8 — Headlamps (H1, H2, H3, HB3, HB4, H7, H8, H9, HIR1 and/or HIR21)
  - R9 — Noise of three-wheeled vehicles
  - R10 — Electromagnetic compatibility
  - R11 — Door latches and hinges
  - R12 — Steering mechanism
  - R13 — Heavy vehicle braking
  - R13H — Braking of passenger cars
  - R14 — Safety-belt anchorages
  - R15 — Emission of gaseous pollutants
  - R16 — Safety-belts
  - R17 — Strength of seats, their anchorages and head restraints
  - R18 — Anti-theft of motor vehicles
  - R19 — Front fog lamps
  - R20 — Headlamps (H4)
  - R21 — Interior fittings
  - R22 — Protective helmets and visors
  - R23 — Reversing lamps
  - R24 — Visible pollutants, measurement of power of C.I. engines (Diesel smoke)
  - R25 — Head restraints (headrests)
  - R26 — External projections of passenger cars
  - R27 — Advance warning triangles
  - R28 — Audible warning devices
  - R29 — Cabs of commercial vehicles
  - R30 — Tyres for passenger cars and their trailers
  - R31 — Headlamps (halogen sealed beam (HSB))
  - R32 — Rear-end collision
  - R33 — Head-on collision
  - R34 — Prevention of fire risks
  - R35 — Foot controls
  - R36 — General construction of large buses and coaches
  - R37 — Filament light sources
  - R38 — Rear fog lamps
  - R39 — Speedometer and odometer
  - R40 — Emission of gaseous pollutants by motor cycles
  - R41 — Noise emissions of motorcycles
  - R42 — Front and rear protection devices
  - R43 — Safety glazing
  - R44 — Child Restraint Systems
  - R45 — Headlamp cleaners
  - R46 — Devices for indirect vision
  - R47 — Emission of gaseous pollutants of mopeds
  - R48 — Installation of lighting and light-signalling devices
  - R49 — Emissions of C.I. and P.I. (LPG and CNG) engines
  - R50 — Position, stop, direction indicators lamps for mopeds and motorcycles
  - R51 — Noise of M and N categories of vehicles
  - R52 — General construction of small buses and coaches
  - R53 — Installation of lighting and light-signalling devices for L3 vehicles
  - R54 — Tyres for commercial vehicles and their trailers
  - R55 — Mechanical coupling
  - R56 — Headlamps (mopeds)
  - R57 — Headlamps (motorcycles)
  - R58 — Rear underrun protective devices (RUPDs)
  - R59 — Replacement silencing systems
  - R60 — Driver operated controls (mopeds/motorcycles)
  - R61 — External projections of commercial vehicles
  - R62 — Anti-theft (mopeds/motorcycles)
  - R63 — Noise emissions of mopeds
  - R64 — Temporary use spare unit, run flat tyres
  - R65 — Special warning lamps
  - R66 — Strength of superstructure (buses)
  - R67 — LPG vehicles
  - R68 — Measurement of the maximum speed, including electric vehicles
  - R69 — Rear marking plates for slow-moving vehicles
  - R70 — Rear marking plates for heavy and long vehicles
  - R71 — Drivers field of vision (agricultural tractors)
  - R72 — Headlamps (HS1 lamps) (motorcycles)
  - R73 — Lateral protection devices
  - R74 — Installation of lighting and light-signalling devices (mopeds)
  - R75 — Tyres for motorcycles/mopeds
  - R76 — Headlamps for mopeds
  - R77 — Parking lamps
  - R78 — Braking (category L vehicles)
  - R79 — Steering equipment
  - R80 — Strength of seats and their anchorages (buses)
  - R81 — Rear-view mirrors (motorcycles/mopeds)
  - R82 — Headlamps (HS2) (moped)
  - R83 — Emissions of M1 and N1 vehicles
  - R84 — Measurement of fuel consumption
  - R85 — Measurement of the net power and the 30 min. power
  - R86 — Installation of lighting and light-signalling devices for agricultural tractors
  - R87 — Daytime running lamps
  - R88 — Retroreflective tyres for two-wheeled vehicles
  - R89 — Speed limitation of devices
  - R90 — Replacement braking parts
  - R91 — Side-marker lamps
  - R92 — Replacement exhaust silencing systems (RESS) for motorcycles
  - R93 — Front underrun protective devices
  - R94 — Frontal collision protection
  - R95 — Lateral collision protection
  - R96 — Emissions from Non-Road Mobile Machinery (NRMM) engines
  - R97 — Vehicle Alarm Systems (VAS)
  - R98 — Headlamps with gas-discharge light sources
  - R99 — Gas-discharge light sources
  - R100 — Electric power trained vehicles
  - R101 — CO2 emission/fuel consumption
  - R102 — Close coupling device (CCD)
  - R103 — Replacement pollution control devices
  - R104 — Retro-reflective markings
  - R105 — Vehicles for the carriage of dangerous goods
  - R106 — Tyres for agricultural vehicles
  - R107 — General construction of buses and coaches
  - R108 — Retreaded tyres for passenger cars and their trailers
  - R109 — Retreaded tyres for commercial vehicles and their trailers
  - R110 — CNG and LNG vehicles
  - R111 — Handling and stability of vehicles
  - R112 — Headlamps emitting an asymmetrical passing-beam
  - R113 — Headlamps emitting a symmetrical passing-beam
  - R114 — Airbag module for a replacement airbag system
  - R115 — LPG and CNG retrofit systems
  - R116 — Anti-theft and alarm systems
  - R117 — Tyres, rolling resistance, rolling noise and wet grip
  - R118 — Fire resistance of interior materials
  - R119 — Cornering lamps
  - R120 — Net power of tractors and non-road mobile machinery
  - R121 — Identification of controls, tell-tales and indicators
  - R122 — Heating system
  - R123 — Adaptive front-lighting systems (AFS)
  - R124 — Replacement wheels for passenger cars
  - R125 — Forward field of vision of drivers
  - R126 — Partitioning systems
  - R127 — Pedestrian Safety
  - R128 — Light Emitting Diode (LED) light sources
  - R129 — Enhanced Child Restraint Systems (ECRS)
  - R130 — Lane Departure Warning System (LDWS)
  - R131 — Advanced Emergency Braking Systems (AEBS)
  - R132 — Retrofit Emission Control Devices (REC)
  - R133 — Recyclability of motor vehicles
  - R134 — Hydrogen and fuel cell vehicles (HFCV)
  - R135 — Pole Side Impact (PSI)
  - R136 — Electric vehicles of category L (EV-L)
  - R137 — Frontal impact with focus on restraint systems
  - R138 — Quiet Road Transport Vehicles (QRTV)
  - R139 — Brake Assist Systems (BAS)
  - R140 — Electronic Stability Control (ESC) Systems
  - R141 — Tyre Pressure Monitoring Systems (TPMS)
  - R142 — Tyres installation
  - R143 — Heavy Duty Dual-Fuel Engine Retrofit Systems (HDDF-ERS)
  - R144 — Accident Emergency Call Systems (AECS)
  - R145 — ISOFIX anchorage systems, ISOFIX top tether anchorages and i-Size seating positions
  - R146 — Hydrogen and Fuel Cell Vehicles of category L
  - R147 — Mechanical coupling components of combinations of agricultural vehicles
  - R148 — Light Signalling Devices (LSD)
  - R149 — Road Illumination Devices (RID)
  - R150 — Retro-Reflective Devices (RRD)
  - R151 — Blind Spot Information System for the Detection of Bicycles
  - R152 — Advanced Emergency Braking System (AEBS)
  - R153 — Fuel system integrity and electric power train safety at rear-end collision
  - R154 — Worldwide harmonized Light vehicles Test Procedure (WLTP)
  - R155 — Cyber security and cyber security management system
  - R156 — Software update and software update management system
  - R157 — Automated Lane Keeping Systems (ALKS)
  - R158 — Devices for means of rear visibility or detection
  - R159 — Moving Off Information System (MOIS)
  - R160 — Event Data Recorder (EDR)
  - R161 — Devices against Unauthorized Use
  - R162 — Immobilizers
  - R163 — Vehicle Alarm systems
  - R164 — Studded Tyres
  - R165 — Reverse Warning
  - R166 — Vulnerable Road Users in Front and Side Close Proximity
  - R167 — Approval of Motor Vehicles with Regard to Their Direct Vision
  - R168 — Global Real Driving Emissions (Global RDE)
  - R169 — Event Data Recorders for Heavy-Duty Vehicles
  - R170 — Child Restraint Systems for Safer Transport of Children in Buses
  - R171 — Driver Control Assistance System (DCAS)
  - R172 — Snow grip performance and traction tyre classification for retreaded tyres

==== UN REGULATIONS: By Category ====
Headlamps
  - R1 & 2 — Headlamps emitting an asymmetrical passing beam and/or a driving beam: 1 Motor vehicle (including R2 and/or HS1 lamps); 2 Incandescent electric lamps — (superseded by R149)
  - R5 — Sealed Beam headlamps (superseded by R149)
  - R8 — Headlamps (H1, H2, H3, HB3, HB4, H7, H8, H9, HIR1 and/or HIR21) (superseded by R149, but still valid for existing approvals)
  - R20 — Headlamps (H4) (superseded by R149)
  - R31 — Headlamps (halogen sealed beam (HSB)) (superseded by R149)
  - R45 — Headlamp cleaners
  - R98 — Headlamps with gas-discharge light sources (superseded by R149, but still valid for existing approvals)
  - R99 — Gas-discharge light sources (See: Automotive lamp types)
  - R112 — Headlamps emitting an asymmetrical passing-beam (superseded by R149, but still valid for existing approvals)
  - R113 — Headlamps emitting a symmetrical passing-beam (superseded by R149, but still valid for existing approvals)
  - R149 — Road Illumination Devices (RID)
General lighting
  - R3 — Retro-reflecting devices (superseded by R150, but still valid for existing approvals)
  - R4 — Illumination of rear registration plates (superseded by R148, but still valid for existing approvals)
  - R6 — Direction indicators (superseded by R148, but still valid for existing approvals)
  - R7 — Position, stop and end-outline lamps (superseded by R148, but still valid for existing approvals)
  - R19 — Front fog lamps (superseded by R149, but still valid for existing approvals)
  - R23 — Reversing lamps (superseded by R148, but still valid for existing approvals)
  - R37 — Filament light sources (bulbs See: Automotive lamp types)
  - R38 — Rear fog lamps (superseded by R148, but still valid for existing approvals)
  - R77 — Parking lamps (superseded by R148, but still valid for existing approvals)
  - R87 — Daytime running lamps (superseded by R148, but still valid for existing approvals)
  - R91 — Side-marker lamps (superseded by R148, but still valid for existing approvals)
  - R119 — Cornering lamps (superseded by R149, but still valid for existing approvals)
  - R123 — Adaptive front-lighting systems (AFS) (superseded by R149, but still valid for existing approvals)
  - R128 — Light Emitting Diode (LED) light sources
  - R148 — Light Signalling Devices (LSD)
  - R150 — Retro-Reflective Devices (RRD)
Instrumentation/controls
  - R35 — Foot controls
  - R39 — Speedometer and odometer
  - R46 — Devices for indirect vision (e.g. rear-view mirrors)
  - R79 — Steering equipment
  - R121 — Identification of controls, tell-tales and indicators
Accident Avoidance; Crashworthiness
  - R11 — Door latches and hinges
  - R13 — Heavy vehicle braking
  - R13H — Braking of passenger cars
  - R14 — Safety-belt anchorages
  - R16 — Safety-belts
  - R17 — Strength of seats, their anchorages and head restraints
  - R21 — Interior fittings (impact absorption)
  - R25 — Head restraints (headrests)
  - R26 — External projections of passenger cars
  - R27 — Advance warning triangles
  - R28 — Audible warning devices (horns)
  - R32 — Rear-end collision Crumple zone
  - R33 — Head-on collision Crumple zone
  - R34 — Prevention of fire risks
  - R42 — Front and rear protection devices (bumpers, etc.)
  - R43 — Safety glazing
  - R44 — Child Restraint Systems
  - R87 — Daytime running lamps
  - R90 — Replacement braking parts
  - R95 — Lateral collision protection
  - R116 — Anti-theft and alarm systems
  - R118 — Fire resistance of interior materials
  - R129 — Enhanced Child Restraint Systems (ECRS)
  - R131 — Advanced Emergency Braking System (AEBS)* R94 — Frontal collision protection
  - R135 — Pole Side Impact (PSI)
  - R137 — Frontal impact with focus on restraint systems
  - R144 — Accident Emergency Call Systems (AECS)
  - R145 — ISOFIX anchorage systems, ISOFIX top tether anchorages and i-Size seating positions
  - R153 — Fuel system integrity and electric power train safety at rear-end collision
  - R170 — Child Restraint Systems for Safer Transport of Children in Buses
Environmental compatibility
  - R10 — Electromagnetic compatibility
  - R15 — Emission of gaseous pollutants (superseded by R83, R84 and R101)
  - R24 — Visible pollutants, measurement of power of C.I. engines (Diesel smoke)
  - R51 — Noise of M and N categories of vehicles
  - R68 — Measurement of the maximum speed, including electric vehicles
  - R83 — Emissions of M1 and N1 vehicles
  - R84 — Measurement of fuel consumption
  - R85 — Measurement of the net power and the 30 min. power (electric drive trains)
  - R100 — Electric power trained vehicles
  - R101 — CO2 emission/fuel consumption (measurement)
  - R132 — Retrofit Emission Control Devices (REC)
  - R133 — Recyclability of motor vehicles
  - R143 — Heavy Duty Dual-Fuel Engine Retrofit Systems (HDDF-ERS)
  - R146 — Hydrogen and Fuel Cell for Vehicles of category L
  - R154 — Worldwide harmonized Light vehicles Test Procedure (WLTP)
  - R168 — Global Real Driving Emissions (Global RDE)
Tyres and wheels
  - R12 — Steering mechanism
  - R30 — Tyres for passenger cars and their trailers
  - R54 — Tyres for commercial vehicles and their trailers
  - R64 — Temporary use spare unit, run flat tyres
  - R108 — Retreaded tyres for passenger cars and their trailers
  - R117 — Tyres, rolling resistance, rolling noise and wet grip (values are on the tyre label)
  - R124 — Replacement wheels for passenger cars
  - R141 — Tyre Pressure Monitoring Systems (TPMS)
  - R142 — Tyres installation
  - R164 — Studded Tyres
  - R172 — Snow grip performance and traction tyre classification for retreaded tyres
Automated warnings & safety systems
  - R130 — Lane Departure Warning System (LDWS)
  - R139 — Brake Assist Systems (BAS)
  - R140 — Electronic Stability Control (ESC) Systems
  - R151 — Blind Spot Information System for the Detection of Bicycles
  - R157 — Automated Lane Keeping Systems (ALKS)
  - R158 — Devices for means of rear visibility or detection
  - R159 — Moving Off Information System (MOIS) (heavy vehicle start off warning; opposite of reverse warning)
  - R165 — Reverse Warning
  - R166 — Vulnerable Road Users in Front and Side Close Proximity
  - R171 — Driver Control Assistance System (DCAS)
Security systems
  - R18 — Anti-theft of motor vehicles
  - R97 — Vehicle Alarm Systems (VAS)
  - R161 — Devices against Unauthorized Use
  - R162 — Immobilizers
Automated/autonomous and connected vehicles
  - R155 — Cyber security and cyber security management system
  - R156 — Software update and software update management system
  - R160 — Event Data Recorder (EDR)
  - R167 — Approval of Motor Vehicles with Regard to Their Direct Vision
  - R169 — Event Data Recorders for Heavy-Duty Vehicles
Two & Three-wheeled vehicles (Motorcycles, Mopeds, Golf carts, etc.)
  - R9 — Noise of three-wheeled vehicles
  - R22 — Protective helmets and visors
  - R40 — Emission of gaseous pollutants by motor cycles
  - R41 — Noise emissions of motorcycles
  - R47 — Emission of gaseous pollutants of mopeds
  - R49 — Emissions of C.I. and P.I. (LPG and CNG) engines
  - R50 — Position, stop, direction indicators lamps for mopeds and motorcycles
  - R53 — Installation of lighting and light-signalling devices for L3 vehicles (motorcycles)
  - R56 — Headlamps (mopeds)
  - R57 — Headlamps (motorcycles)
  - R59 — Replacement silencing systems
  - R60 — Driver operated controls (mopeds/motorcycles)
  - R62 — Anti-theft (mopeds/motorcycles)
  - R63 — Noise emissions of mopeds
  - R69 — Rear marking plates for slow-moving vehicles
  - R70 — Rear marking plates for heavy and long vehicles
  - R73 — Lateral protection devices
  - R72 — Headlamps (HS1 lamps) (motorcycles)
  - R74 — Installation of lighting and light-signalling devices for L1 vehicles
  - R74 — Installation of lighting and light-signalling devices (mopeds)
  - R75 — Tyres for motorcycles/mopeds
  - R76 — Headlamps for mopeds
  - R78 — Braking (category L vehicles)
  - R81 — Rear-view mirrors (motorcycles/mopeds)
  - R82 — Headlamps (HS2) (moped)
  - R88 — Retroreflective tyres for two-wheeled vehicles
  - R92 — Replacement exhaust silencing systems (RESS) for motorcycles
  - R136 — Electric vehicles of category L (EV-L)
Commercial and Heavy vehicles
  - R29 — Cabs of commercial vehicles
  - R36 — General construction of large buses and coaches
  - R52 — General construction of small buses and coaches
  - R55 — Mechanical coupling (combinations of vehicles)
  - R58 — Rear underrun protective devices (RUPDs)
  - R61 — External projections of commercial vehicles
  - R66 — Strength of superstructure (buses)
  - R80 — Strength of seats and their anchorages (buses)
  - R93 — Front underrun protective devices (FUPDs)
  - R107 — General construction of buses and coaches
  - R109 — Retreaded tyres for commercial vehicles and their trailers
  - R121 — Identification of controls, tell-tales and indicators (for M1 and N1 vehicles)
  - R152 — Advanced Emergency Braking Systems (AEBS) (for M1 and N1 vehicles)
  - R163 — Vehicle Alarm systems (VAS) (for M1 and N1 vehicles)
  - R169 — Event Data Recorders for Heavy-Duty Vehicles
Agricultural vehicles
  - R48 — Installation of lighting and light-signalling devices (for vehicle categories M, N and O)
  - R71 — Drivers field of vision (agricultural tractors)
  - R86 — Installation of lighting and light-signalling devices for agricultural tractors
  - R106 — Tyres for agricultural vehicles
  - R147 — Mechanical coupling components of combinations of agricultural vehicles
Alternative fuel vehicles
  - R67 — LPG vehicles
  - R110 — CNG and LNG vehicles
  - R115 — LPG and CNG retrofit systems
  - R134 — Hydrogen and fuel cell vehicles (HFCV)
Other regulations
  - R0 — International Whole Vehicle Type Approval (IWVTA)
  - R65 — Special warning lamps (flashing amber, red, or blue lights)
  - R89 — Speed limitation of devices
  - R96 — Emissions from Non-Road Mobile Machinery (NRMM) engines
  - R102 — Close coupling device (CCD)
  - R103 — Replacement pollution control devices
  - R104 — Retro-reflective markings
  - R105 — Vehicles for the carriage of dangerous goods
  - R111 — Handling and stability of vehicles
  - R114 — Airbag module for a replacement airbag system
  - R120 — Net power of tractors and non-road mobile machinery
  - R122 — Heating system
  - R125 — Forward field of vision of drivers
  - R126 — Partitioning systems
  - R127 — Pedestrian Safety
  - R138 — Quiet Road Transport Vehicles (QRTV)

== North America ==
The most notable non-signatory to the 1958 Agreement is the United States, which has its own Federal Motor Vehicle Safety Standards and does not recognise UN type approvals. However, both the United States and Canada are parties to the 1998 Agreement. UN-specification vehicles and components which do not also comply with the US regulations therefore cannot be imported to the US without extensive modifications.

Canada has its own Canada Motor Vehicle Safety Standards, broadly similar to the US FMVSS, but Canada does also accept UN-compliant headlamps and bumpers. The impending Comprehensive Economic and Trade Agreement between Canada and the European Union could see Canada recognise more UN Regulations as acceptable alternatives to the Canadian regulations. Canada currently applies 14 of the 17 ECE main standards as allowable alternatives - the exceptions at this point relate to motorcycle controls and displays, motorcycle mirrors, and electronic stability control for passenger cars. These three remaining groups will be allowed in Canada by the time the ratification of the trade deal occurs.

=== Grey Market (1976-88) ===
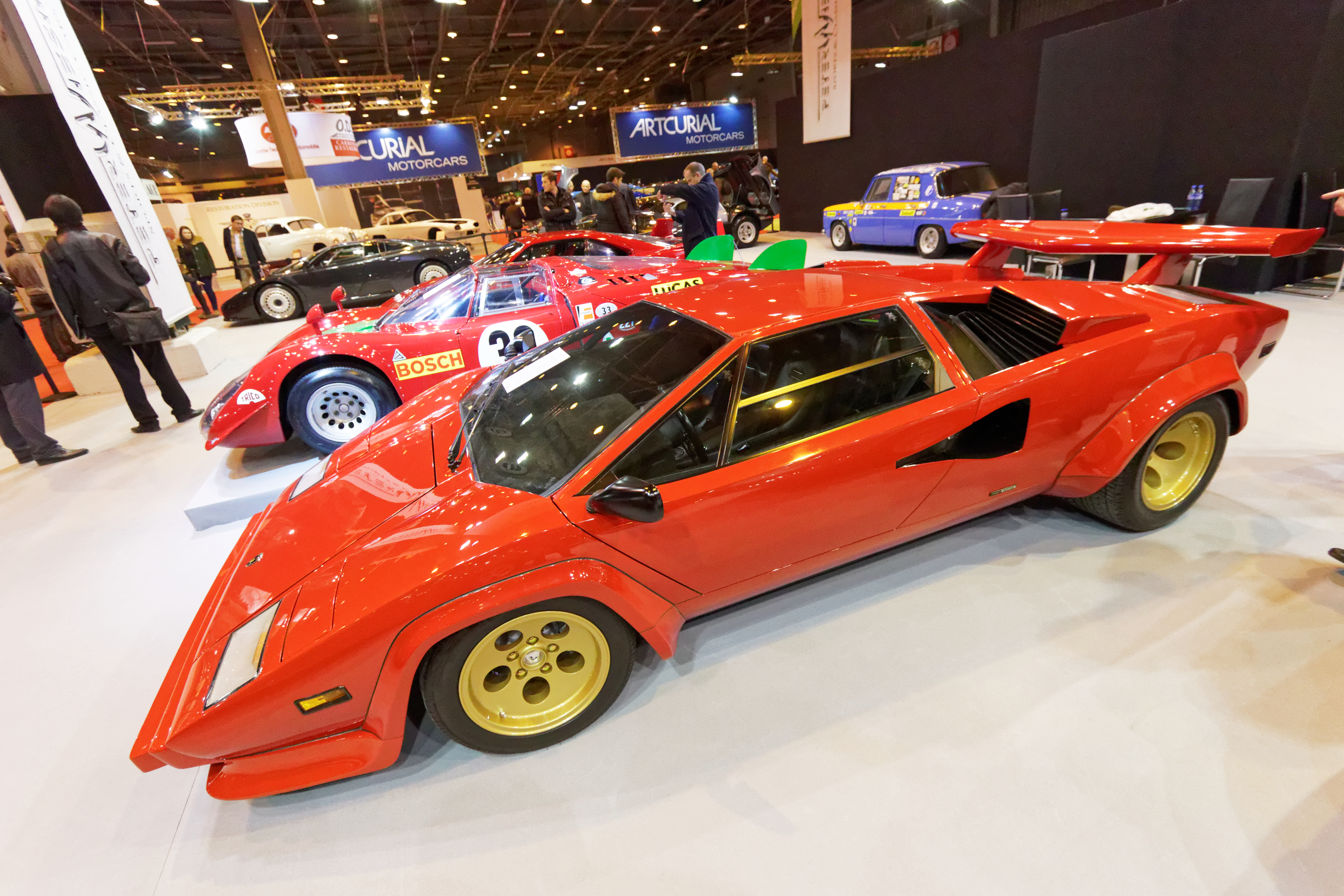
1981 Lamborghini Countach LP 400S sold new in the United States via the grey market

Vehicles built in compliance with global safety and emissions regulations were still available to Americans in the period 1976-88, as individual imports. This was via the grey market. Many of the finest, iconic automobiles of the Malaise era, such as the Lamborghini Countach, Mercedes-Benz 500 SEL, Mercedes-Benz G-Class and Range Rover were officially forbidden to Americans, but this outlet proved viable for many years. The grey market reached 66,900 vehicles imported by individual consumers in 1985, and altered to meet U.S. design regulations. It is no longer possible to import a vehicle into the United States as a personal import, with four exceptions, none of which permits Americans to buy recent vehicles not officially available in the United States. Even prominent billionaire Bill Gates and his Porsche 959 have proven unable.

=== Self-certification ===
Rather than a UN-style system of type approvals, the US and Canadian auto safety regulations operate on the principle of self-certification, wherein the manufacturer or importer of a vehicle or item of motor vehicle equipment certifies—i.e., asserts and promises—that the vehicle or equipment complies with all applicable federal or Canada Motor Vehicle Safety, bumper and antitheft standards. No prior verification is required by a governmental agency or authorised testing entity before the vehicle or equipment can be imported, sold, or used. If reason develops to believe the certification was false or improper — i.e., that the vehicle or equipment does not in fact comply — then authorities may conduct tests and, if a noncompliance is found, order a recall and/or other corrective and/or punitive measures. Vehicle and equipment makers are permitted to appeal such penalties, but this is a difficult direction. Non-compliances found that are arguably without effect to highway safety may be petitioned to skip recall (remedy and notification) requirements for vehicles already produced.

== Regulatory differences ==
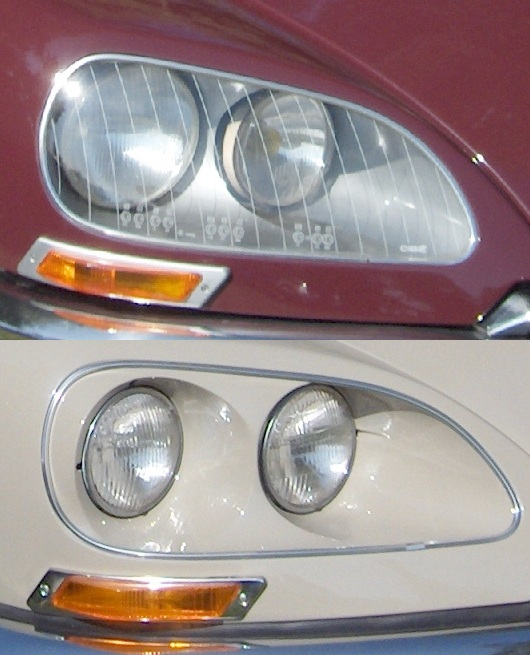
A comparison of European (top) and US (bottom) headlamp configuration on similar-year Citroën DS cars

Historically, one of the most conspicuous differences between UN and US regulations was the design and performance of headlamps. The Citroën DS shown here illustrates the large differences in headlamps during the 1940-1983 era when US regulations required sealed beam headlamps, which were prohibited in many European countries. A similar approach was evident with the US mandatory side marker lights.

== 1998 Agreement ==
The "Agreement concerning the Establishing of Global Technical Regulations for Wheeled Vehicles, Equipment and Parts which can be fitted and/or be used on Wheeled Vehicles", or 1998 Agreement, is a subsequent agreement. Following its mission to harmonize vehicle regulations, the UNECE solved the main issues (Administrative Provisions for Type approval opposed to self-certification and mutual recognition of Type Approvals) preventing non-signatory Countries to the 1958 Agreement to fully participate to its activities.

The 1998 Agreement is born to produce meta regulations called Global Technical Regulations without administrative procedures for type approval and so, without the principle of mutual recognition of Type Approvals. The 1998 Agreement stipulates that Contracting Parties will establish, by consensus vote, United Nations Global Technical Regulations (UN GTRs) in a UN Global Registry. The UN GTRs contain globally harmonized performance requirements and test procedures. Each UN GTR contains extensive notes on its development. The text includes a record of the technical rationale, the research sources used, cost and benefit considerations, and references to data consulted. The Contracting Parties use their nationally established rulemaking processes when transposing UN GTRs into their national legislation. As of October 2024, the 1998 Agreement has 40 Contracting Parties and 24 UN GTRs that have been established into the UN Global Registry. Manufacturers and suppliers cannot use directly the UN GTRs as these are intended to serve the Countries and require transposition in national or regional law.

== 2013 Transatlantic Trade and Investment Partnership (proposed) ==
As part of the Transatlantic Trade and Investment Partnership (TTIP) negotiations, the issues of divergent standards in automobile regulatory structure are being investigated. TTIP negotiators are seeking to identify ways to narrow the regulatory differences, potentially reducing costs and spurring additional trade in vehicles.

== OICA ==
Organisation Internationale des Constructeurs d'Automobiles (OICA) hosts on its web site the working documents from various United Nations expert groups including World Forum for Harmonization of Vehicle Regulations.

== See also ==
- Vehicle regulation
- Car safety
- Worldwide harmonized Light vehicles Test Procedures
- National Highway Traffic Safety Administration
- Federal Motor Vehicle Safety Standards
- Federal Motor Vehicle Safety Standard 108
- Automotive lighting
- Headlamps
- Street-legal vehicle
