= Federal Motor Vehicle Safety Standard 116 =

Federal Motor Vehicle Safety Standard

Federal Motor Vehicle Safety Standard 116 (FMVSS 116) regulates motor vehicle brake fluids in the United States. Like all other Federal Motor Vehicle Safety Standards, FMVSS 116 is administered by the United States Department of Transportation's National Highway Traffic Safety Administration.

This standard specifies requirements for fluids for use in hydraulic brake systems of motor vehicles, containers for these fluids, and labeling of the containers. The purpose is to reduce failures in hydraulic braking systems of motor vehicles which may occur because of the manufacture or use of improper or contaminated fluid. The standard applies to all fluid use of passenger cars, multipurpose passenger vehicles, trucks, buses, trailers and motorcycles equipped with a hydraulic brake system.

== See also ==
- Federal Motor Vehicle Safety Standards
