= Title 49 of the Code of Federal Regulations =

U.S. federal rules and regulations on transportation

CFR Title 49 - Transportation is one of fifty titles comprising the United States Code of Federal Regulations (CFR). Title 49 is the principal set of rules and regulations (sometimes called administrative law) issued by the Departments of Transportation and Homeland Security, federal agencies of the United States regarding transportation and transportation-related security. This title is available in digital and printed form, and can be referenced online using the Electronic Code of Federal Regulations (e-CFR).

== History ==
Publication of Title 49 began in 1938, at which point it was entitled Transportation and Railroads. It was renamed in 1949 to Transportation.

== Current structure ==
The table of contents, as reflected in the e-CFR updated February 18, 2014, is as follows:

Volume	Chapter	Parts	Regulatory Entity
1		1-99	Subtitle A--Office of the Secretary of Transportation
2	I	100-177	Pipeline and Hazardous Materials Safety Administration, Department of Transportation
3		178-199	Pipeline and Hazardous Materials Safety Administration, Department of Transportation
4	II	200-299	Federal Railroad Administration, Department of Transportation
5	III	300-399	Federal Motor Carrier Safety Administration, Department of Transportation
6	IV	400-499	United States Coast Guard, Department of Homeland Security
	V	500-571	National Highway Traffic Safety Administration, Department of Transportation
7		572-599	National Highway Traffic Safety Administration, Department of Transportation
	VI	600-699 (GPO)	Federal Transit Administration, Department of Transportation
	VII	700-799	National Railroad Passenger Corporation (Amtrak)
	VIII	800-999	National Transportation Safety Board
8	X	1000-1199	Surface Transportation Board, Department of Transportation
9		1200-1399	Surface Transportation Board, Department of Transportation
	XI	1400-1499 [Reserved]	Research and Innovative Technology Administration, Department of Transportation
	XII	1500-1699	Transportation Security Administration, Department of Homeland Security
