= Federal Motor Vehicle Safety Standard 208 =

Automobile standard in the United States

Federal Motor Vehicle Safety Standard 208 (FMVSS 208) regulates automotive occupant crash protection in the United States. Like all other Federal Motor Vehicle Safety Standards, FMVSS 208 is administered by the United States Department of Transportation's National Highway Traffic Safety Administration.

This standard originally specified the type of occupant restraints (i.e., seat belts) required. It was amended to specify performance requirements for anthropomorphic test dummies seated in the front outboard seats of passenger cars and of certain multi-purpose passenger vehicles, trucks, and buses, including the active and passive restraint systems. The purpose of the standard is to reduce the number of fatalities and the number and severity of injuries to occupants involved in frontal crashes.

== See also ==
- Seat belt
- Airbag
- FMVSS
