= ECE Regulation 90 =

ECE Regulation 90 (abbreviated "ECE R90") is an ECE Regulation specifying design, construction, and performance requirements and test protocols for replacement brake linings for roadgoing motor vehicles and trailers.

R90 calls for linings to be tested for speed sensitivity, cold performance, and replacement Brake pads and brake shoes are permitted to deviate from the frictional characteristics of their original-equipment counterparts by not more than 15%. In addition, R90 requires tamper-evident, sealed packaging for replacement brake linings.

Type-approval to R90 is required for all replacement brake linings throughout the European Union and in non-European countries that have adopted ECE Regulations.

== Test protocols ==
Tests required by R90 include:

- Bedding (burnishing)
- Performance Check
- Brake Tests
- Cold Performance Equivalence and Speed Sensitivity Tests

For the tests the vehicle brake for which the replacement linings are designed is installed in an inertia dynamometer instrumented for continuous recording of rotative speed, brake torque, brake line pressure, number of rotations after brake application, braking time, and brake rotor temperature.
