= Vehicle category =

Classification of a land vehicle for regulatory purposes

A vehicle category classifies a land vehicle or trailer for regulatory purposes.

== UNECE categories ==
United Nations Economic Commission for Europe Information from Consolidated Resolution on the Construction of Vehicles (R.E.3), Revision 6.

Some categories have further sub classes. See Consolidated Resolution on the Construction of Vehicles (R.E.3) for further information.

Vehicles in the table listed within parentheses are examples of the vehicle in that category, e.g. (Bus).

§	Category	Description
2.1	L	Motor vehicles with less than four wheels [but does include light four-wheelers]
2.1.1	L1	A two-wheeled vehicle with an engine cylinder capacity in the case of a thermic engine not exceeding 50 cm³ and whatever the means of propulsion a maximum design speed not exceeding 50 km/h. (Electric bicycle)
2.1.2	L2	A three-wheeled vehicle of any wheel arrangement with an engine cylinder capacity in the case of a thermic engine not exceeding 50 cm³ and whatever the means of propulsion a maximum design speed not exceeding 50 km/h. (Auto rickshaw)
2.1.3	L3	A two-wheeled vehicle with an engine cylinder capacity in the case of a thermic engine exceeding 50 cm³ or whatever the means of propulsion a maximum design speed exceeding 50 km/h. (Motorcycle)
2.1.4	L4	A vehicle with three wheels asymmetrically arranged in relation to the longitudinal median plane with an engine cylinder capacity in the case of a thermic engine exceeding 50 cm³ or whatever the means of propulsion a maximum design speed exceeding 50 km/h (motor cycles with sidecars).
2.1.5	L5	A vehicle with three wheels symmetrically arranged in relation to the longitudinal median plane with an engine cylinder capacity in the case of a thermic engine exceeding 50 cm³ or whatever the means of propulsion a maximum design speed exceeding 50 km/h. (Motorized tricycle)
2.1.6	L6	A vehicle with four wheels whose unladen mass is not more than 350 kg, not including the mass of the batteries in case of electric vehicles, whose maximum design speed is not more than 45 km/h, and whose engine cylinder capacity does not exceed 50 cm³ for spark (positive) ignition engines, or whose maximum net power output does not exceed 4 kW in the case of other internal combustion engines, or whose maximum continuous rated power does not exceed 4 kW in the case of electric engines. (Golf cart, Mobility scooter)
2.1.7	L7	A vehicle with four wheels, other than that classified for the category L6, whose unladen mass is not more than 400 kg (550 kg for vehicles intended for carrying goods), not including the mass of batteries in the case of electric vehicles and whose maximum continuous rated power does not exceed 15 kW. (Microcars)
2.2	M	Vehicles having at least four wheels and used for the carriage of passengers (e.g., standard car with 2, 3, 4 doors).
2.2.1	M1	Vehicles used for carriage of passengers, comprising not more than eight seats in addition to the driver's = 9.( Larger Than Standard Car e.g.: London Cab / E7 Type Vehicle 8 seat + Driver.)
2.2.2	M2	Vehicles used for the carriage of passengers, comprising more than eight seats in addition to the driver's seat, and having a maximum mass not exceeding 5 tonnes. (Bus)
2.2.3	M3	Vehicles used for the carriage of passengers, comprising more than eight seats in addition to the driver's seat, and having a maximum mass exceeding 5 tonnes. (Bus)
2.3	N	Power-driven vehicles having at least four wheels and used for the carriage of goods
2.3.1	N1	Vehicles used for the carriage of goods and having a maximum mass not exceeding 3.5 tonnes. (Pick-up Truck, Van)
2.3.2	N2	Vehicles used for the carriage of goods and having a maximum mass exceeding 3.5 tonnes but not exceeding 12 tonnes. (Commercial Truck)
2.3.3	N3	Vehicles used for the carriage of goods and having a maximum mass exceeding 12 tonnes. (Commercial Truck)
2.4	O	Trailers (including semi–trailers)
2.4.1	O1	Trailers with a maximum mass not exceeding 0.75 tonnes.
2.4.2	O2	Trailers with a maximum mass exceeding 0.75 tonnes, but not exceeding 3.5 tonnes.
2.4.3	O3	Trailers with a maximum mass exceeding 3.5 tonnes, but not exceeding 10 tonnes.
2.4.4	O4	Trailers with a maximum mass exceeding 10 tonnes.
2.5		Special purpose vehicle (Note: A vehicle of category M, N or O for conveying passengers or goods and for performing a special function for which special body arrangements and/or equipment are necessary.)
2.5.1		Motor caravan, (Note: A special purpose M1 category vehicle constructed to include accommodation space.) also Campervan, Motorhome.
2.5.2		Armored car (VIP), Armored car (valuables) (Note: Vehicle intended for the protection of conveyed passengers and/or goods and complying with armour plating anti-bullet requirements.)
2.5.3		Ambulance (Note: Motor vehiclef category M intended for the transport of sick or injured people and having special equipment for such purpose.)
2.5.4		Hearse (Note: Motor vehicle intended for the transport of deceased people and having special equipment for such purpose.)
2.6	T	Agricultural and Forestry tractors (Note: A power-driven vehicle, either wheeled or track laying, which has at least two-axles, whose function depends essentially on its tractive power, and which is specially designed to pull, push, carry or actuate certain implements, machines or trailers intended for use in agriculture or forestry. Such a tractor may be arranged to carry a load (E.g.: Forwarder) and attendants.)
2.7		Non-road mobile machinery (Note: Any mobile machine, transportable industrial equipment or vehicle with or without body work, not intended for the use of passenger- or goods-transport on the road, in which an internal combustion engine is installed.)
2.8	G	Off-road vehicles (Note: Off-road vehicles are considered to be the vehicles of categories M and N.) (Note: Symbols M and N may be combined with symbol G. For example, a vehicle of category N1 which is suited for off-road use may be designated as N1G.)
2.9.2		Special purpose vehicles (M1)
2.9.2.1	SA	Motor caravan: see paragraph 2.5.1.
2.9.2.2	SB	Armoured vehicle: see paragraph 2.5.2.
2.9.2.3	SC	Ambulance: see paragraph 2.5.3.
2.9.2.4	SD	Hearse: see paragraph 2.5.4.

== EU classification ==
In the European Union, the classifications for vehicle category are based on UNECE standards and defined by:

- Regulation (EU) No 168/2013 of the European Parliament and of the Council of 15 January 2013 on the approval and market surveillance of two- or three-wheel vehicles and quadricycles.
- Directive 2007/46/EC of the European Parliament and of the Council of 5 September 2007 establishing a framework for the approval of motor vehicles and their trailers, and of systems, components and separate technical units intended for such vehicles.

The EU general classification of vehicle categories is:

- Two- or three-wheel vehicles and quadricycles:
  - Category L1e: light two-wheel powered vehicle
    - Category L1e-A: powered cycle
    - Category L1e-B: two-wheel moped
  - Category L2e: three-wheel moped
    - Category L2e-P: three-wheel moped designed for passenger transport
    - Category L2e-U: three wheel moped designed for utility purposes
  - Category L3e: two-wheel motorcycle
    - sub-categorized by performance:
      - Category L3e-A1: low-performance motorcycle
      - Category L3e-A2: medium-performance motorcycle
      - Category L3e-A3: high-performance motorcycle
    - sub-categorized by special use:
      - Category L3e-A1E, L3e-A2E or L3e-A3E: enduro motorcycle
      - Category L3e-A1T, L3e-A2T or L3e-A3T: trial motorcycle
  - Category L4e: two-wheel motorcycle with side-car
  - Category L5e: powered tricycle
    - Category L5e-A: tricycle (mainly designed for passenger transport)
    - Category L5e-B: commercial tricycle (utility tricycle exclusively designed for the carriage of goods)
  - Category L6e: light quadricycle
    - Category L6e-A: light on-road quad
    - Category L6e-B: light quadri-mobile
      - Category L6e-BU: light quadri-mobile for utility purposes (utility vehicle exclusively designed for the carriage of goods)
      - Category L6e-BP: light quadri-mobile for passenger transport (vehicle mainly designed for passenger transport)
  - Category L7e: heavy quadricycles
    - Category L7e-A: heavy on-road quad
      - Category L7e-A1: A1 on-road quad
      - Category L7e-A2: A2 on-road quad
    - Category L7e-B: heavy all terrain quad
      - Category L7e-B1: all terrain quad
      - Category L7e-B2: side-by-side buggy
    - Category L7e-C: heavy quadri-mobile
      - Category L7e-CU: heavy quadri-mobile for utility purposes (utility vehicle exclusively designed for the carriage of goods)
      - Category L7e-CP: heavy quadri-mobile for passenger transport (vehicle mainly designed for passenger transport)
- Motor vehicles with at least four wheels:
  - Category M: used for the carriage of passengers
    - Category M1: no more than eight seats in addition to the driver seat (mainly, cars)
    - more than eight seats in addition to the driver seat (buses):
      - Category M2: having a maximum mass not exceeding 5 tonnes (11,000 lb)
      - Category M3: having a maximum mass exceeding 5 tonnes
  - Category N: used for the carriage of goods (trucks):
    - Category N1: having a maximum mass not exceeding 3.5 tonnes (7,700 lb)
    - Category N2: having a maximum mass exceeding 3.5 tonnes but not exceeding 12 tonnes (26,000 lb)
    - Category N3: having a maximum mass exceeding 12 tonnes
- Category O: trailers (including semi-trailers)
  - Category O1: maximum mass not exceeding 0.75 tonnes (1,700 lb)
  - Category O2: exceeding 0.75 tonnes but not exceeding 3.5 tonnes (7,700 lb)
  - Category O3: exceeding 3.5 tonnes but not exceeding 10 tonnes (22,000 lb)
  - Category O4: exceeding 10 tonnes
- Symbol G: off-road vehicles
- Special purpose vehicles

== European driving licenses ==
There is also a different category classification for driver licensing purposes.

The table below shows a translation of Vehicle Categories to European Driving Licence Categories, indicating which vehicle class can be driven with which category of licence.

Vehicle Category	European Driving Licence	Notes
L1e	AM	
L2e	AM	
L3e-A1	A1	
L3e-A2	A2	
L3e-A3	A	
L5e	A1, A	
L6e	AM, B1	Cat AM up to 350 kg unladen; cat B1 for four-wheel vehicles up to 550 kg unladen
L7e	B1, B	Cat B1 for four-wheel vehicles up to 550 kg unladen; cat B up to 3.5 tonnes maximum authorised mass
M1	B	C when mass > 3500 kg
M2	D1, D	For more than 16 seats in addition to the driver's seat Cat D only.
M3	D1, D	For more than 16 seats in addition to the driver's seat Cat D only.
N1	B	
N2	C1, C	For mass between 7.5 and 12 tonnes Cat C only.
N3	C	
O1	B, C1, C, D1, D	
O2	BE, C1E, CE, D1E, DE	
O3	C1E, CE, D1E, DE	
O4	C1E, CE	

== Country-specific classifications ==
=== Czech Republic ===
In the Czech Republic, land vehicle categories are defined by the act No. 56/2001 Sb. and the ordinance No. 341/2002 Sb. Categories M (including M1, M2, M3), N (including N1, N2, N3), of-road symbol G of M and N vehicles (M1G, M2G, M3G, N1G, N2G, N3G) and the category O (including O1, O2, O3 and O4) are defined according to the EU directive. Moreover, there are defined categories:

- Category L: light motor vehicles
  - Category LM: bicycles with auxiliary motor (volume of cylinder not exceeding 50 ccm, design speed not exceeding 25 km/h)
  - Category LA: two-wheeled mopeds (generally, volume of cylinder not exceeding 50 ccm, design speed not exceeding 45 km/h)
  - Category LB: three-wheeled mopeds and light four-wheelers (generally, volume of cylinder not exceeding 50 ccm or motor power not exceeding 4 kW, design speed not exceeding 45 km/h, mass of empty vehicle not exceeding 350 kg)
  - Category LC: motorcycles (two-wheeled, with one or more parameters exceeding the LA category)
  - Category LD: motorcycles with sidecars (with one or more parameters exceeding the LB category)
  - Category LE: tricars and four-wheelers (with one or more parameters exceeding the LB category), four-wheelers of mass not exceeding 400 kg (or 550 kg in case of freight vehicle) motor power of four-wheeler not exceeding 15 kW
- Category T: forestry and agricultural tractors
  - Category T1: standard tractors (a gauge exceeding 1150 mm, mass of empty vehicle exceeding 600 kg, ride height not exceeding 1000 mm
  - Category T2: mass of empty vehicle exceeding 600 kg, a gauge less than 1150 mm, ride height less than 600 mm
  - Category T3: vehicle mass less than 600 kg
  - Category T4.1: ride height more than 1000 mm
  - Category T4.2: extra wide tractors
  - Category OT1: tractor trailer, maximum mass not exceeding 1.5 tonnes
  - Category OT2: tractor trailer, maximum mass exceeding 1.5 tonnes but not exceeding 3.5 tonnes
  - Category OT3: tractor trailer, maximum mass exceeding 3.5 tonnes but not exceeding 6 tonnes
  - Category OT4: tractor trailer, maximum mass exceeding 6 tonnes
- Category S: movable industrial machines
  - Category SS: self-propelled industrial machines
  - Category SP: trailer industrial machines (SP1 up to 3 tonnes, SP2 up to 6 tonnes, SP3 over 6 tonnes)
  - Category SPT: tractor trailer industrial machines (SPT1, SPT2...)
- Category R: other vehicles (contains human-powered and animal-powered vehicles like bicycles and carts, wheelchairs, motor vehicles without carriage body, caterpillar vehicles, one-axle tractors etc.)

=== Philippines ===
Motor vehicles in the Philippines follow UNECE standards and are defined in Department of Transportation and Communications (DOTC) Department Order No. 2010-32, which was issued on September 8, 2010. Initially adopted only for gasoline and diesel motor vehicles, classifications for electric vehicles were added through Land Transportation Office (LTO) Administrative Order No. 2021-039, issued on May 11, 2021, which also added subcategories for L1 and L2 electric vehicles covering e-bikes and mopeds.

As of 2024, the Category L classifications were simplified through the issuance of LTO Administrative Order No. VDM-2024-044, which removed the Personal Mobility Scooter and Electric Kick Scooter categories and the sub-classifications of L1a, L1b, L2a, and L2b.

- Electric Mobility Scooter: two, three, or four-wheeled electric vehicle, maximum speed not exceeding 12.5 km/h (7.8 mph) and powered by less than 300 W
- Category L
  - Category L1: two-wheeled electric, diesel, or gasoline vehicle, maximum speed not exceeding 50 km/h (31 mph)
  - Category L2: three-wheeled electric, diesel, or gasoline vehicle, maximum speed not exceeding 50 km/h (31 mph)
  - Category L3: two-wheeled electric, diesel, or gasoline vehicle, maximum speed exceeding 50 km/h (31 mph)
  - Category L4: three-wheeled asymmetrical electric, diesel, or gasoline vehicle, maximum speed exceeding 50 km/h (31 mph), electric variants with maximum curb weight exceeding 600 kilograms (1,300 lb) and powered by at least 1000 W
  - Category L5: three-wheeled symmetrical electric, gasoline, or diesel vehicle, maximum speed exceeding 50 km/h (31 mph), electric variants with maximum curb weight exceeding 600 kilograms (1,300 lb) and powered by at least 1000 W
  - Category L6: four-wheeled electric, gasoline, or diesel vehicle, maximum speed not exceeding 45 km/h (28 mph), electric variants with maximum curb weight exceeding 350 kilograms (770 lb) and powered by up to 4000 W
  - Category L7: four-wheeled electric, gasoline, or diesel vehicle, maximum speed not exceeding 45 km/h (28 mph), electric variants with maximum curb weight exceeding 350 to 550 kilograms (770 to 1,210 lb) and powered by up to 15000 W
- Category M
  - Category M1: electric, gasoline, or diesel vehicle with not more than 8 passenger seats, gasoline and diesel variants with a gross vehicle weight not exceeding 5,000 kilograms (5.0 t), electric variants with a gross vehicle weight not exceeding 3,500 kilograms (3.5 t)
  - Category M2: electric, gasoline, or diesel vehicle with more than 8 passenger seats, gasoline and diesel variants with a gross vehicle weight not exceeding 5,000 kilograms (5.0 t), electric variants with a gross vehicle weight not exceeding 3,500 to 5,000 kilograms (3.5 to 5.0 t)
  - Category M3: electric, gasoline, or diesel vehicle with more than 8 passenger seats, gross vehicle weight exceeding 5,000 kilograms (5.0 t)
- Category N:
  - Category N1: electric, gasoline, or diesel vehicle carrying goods with a gross vehicle weight not exceeding 3,500 kilograms (3.5 t)
  - Category N2: electric, gasoline, or diesel vehicle carrying goods with a gross vehicle weight from 3,500 to 12,000 kilograms (3.5 to 12.0 t)
  - Category N3: electric, gasoline, or diesel vehicle carrying goods with a gross vehicle weight exceeding 12,000 kilograms (12 t)
- Category O:
  - Category O1: articulated gasoline or diesel vehicle with a gross vehicle weight not exceeding 750 kilograms (0.75 t)
  - Category O2: articulated gasoline or diesel vehicle with a gross vehicle weight from 750 to 3,500 kilograms (0.75 to 3.50 t)
  - Category O3: articulated gasoline or diesel vehicle with a gross vehicle weight exceeding 3,500 kilograms (3.5 t)

== See also ==
- Bus
- Car classification
- Vehicle size class
- European emission standards
- Motorised quadricycle
- Truck classification
- Type approval
- UNECE
- Vehicle acronyms and abbreviations
- Vehicle regulation
