= Outline of automobiles =

Overview of and topical guide to automobiles

The following outline is provided as an overview of and topical guide to automobiles:

Automobile (or car) – wheeled passenger vehicle that carries its own motor. Most definitions of the term specify that automobiles are designed to run primarily on roads, to have seating for one to six people, typically have four wheels, and be constructed principally for the transport of people rather than goods. As of 2002 there were 590 million passenger cars worldwide (roughly one car for every eleven people), of which 140 million were in the U.S. (roughly one car for every two people).

== Types of automobile ==
The basic automobile is privately owned for transporting the owner and their passengers. See automobile. Other types of cars include:

- Alternative fuel vehicle
- Armored car
- Battery vehicle (electric car)
- Police car
- Solar vehicle
- Taxicab

=== By car body style ===
- By size
  - City car
  - Compact car
  - Full-size car
  - Kei car
  - Large family car
  - Microcar
  - Mid-size car
  - Supermini
  - Voiturette
- By body style
  - Convertible
    - Cabrio coach
    - Drophead coupe
    - Retractable hardtop
    - Roadster
    - Targa top
    - T-top
  - Coupé
    - Quad coupé
  - Crossover SUV
  - Fastback
  - Hardtop
  - Hatchback
  - Liftback
  - Limousine
  - Minivan
  - Notchback
  - Pickup truck
    - Coupé utility
    - Ute
  - Sedan (Saloon)
  - Shooting-brake
  - Sport utility vehicle
  - Station wagon
  - Touring car
  - Town car
  - Van
    - Leisure activity vehicle
    - Panel van
  - Tow truck
- Other car types
  - 2 plus 2
  - Antique car
  - Classic car
  - Custom car
  - Luxury vehicle
    - Compact executive car
    - Executive car
    - Personal luxury car
  - Sports car
    - Grand tourer
    - Hot hatch
    - Hot rod
    - Muscle car
    - Pony car
    - Sport compact
    - Supercar
  - Taxicab

=== Specialized vehicles ===
- Amphibious vehicle
- Driverless car
- Flying car
- Gyrocar

=== By propulsion system ===
- Internal combustion engine
- Electric vehicle
  - Battery electric vehicle
  - Neighborhood Electric Vehicle
  - Hybrid vehicle
  - Plug-in hybrid
  - Plug-in electric vehicle
- Hydrogen vehicle
  - Fuel cell
- Steam car
- Alternative fuel vehicle
  - Autogas
  - Biodiesel
  - Common ethanol fuel mixtures
  - Flexible-fuel vehicle
  - Gasoline Direct Injection
  - Homogeneous Charge Compression Ignition
  - Liquid Nitrogen

==== By engine ====
===== By engine type =====
- Engine configuration (IC engines only)
  - Flat engine
  - Flathead engine
  - Four-stroke engine
  - H engine
  - Pushrod engine
  - Reciprocating engine
  - Single-cylinder engine
  - Straight engine
  - Straight-six engine
  - Two-stroke engine
  - Turbo charger
  - V engine
  - W engine
  - Wankel engine

===== By engine fuel type =====
- Engine fuel type
  - Diesel engine
  - Electric car
  - Gasoline engine
  - Hybrid vehicle
  - Hydrogen vehicle
  - Steam car

==== By engine positioning ====
- Engine positioning
  - Front-engine
  - Rear-engine
  - Mid-engine

=== By drive type ===
- Drive wheels
  - Two-wheel-drive
  - Four-wheel-drive
  - Front-wheel-drive
  - Rear-wheel-drive

=== By layout ===
- Layout
  - Front-engine, front-wheel-drive
  - Rear-engine, front-wheel-drive
  - Front-engine, rear-wheel-drive
  - Front mid-engine, rear-wheel-drive
  - Rear mid-engine, rear-wheel-drive
  - Mid-engine, front-wheel-drive
  - Rear-engine, rear-wheel-drive

== Automotive design ==
- Automotive design
  - Body
  - Framework
    - Automobile platform
    - Auto detailing
    - Automobile restoration
    - Automobile engine replacement
    - Car model
    - Facelift
    - Rebedging
    - Trim level
    - Car tuning
    - Car custom
    - Body-on-frame
    - Bumper
    - Cabrio coach
    - Chassis
    - Continental tire
    - Crumple zone
    - Dagmar bumpers
    - Decklid
    - Fender
    - Fender skirts
    - Grille (architecture)
    - Hood
    - Hood scoop
    - Monocoque
    - Overhang
    - Pillar
    - Ponton (automobile)
    - Pontoon fenders
    - Quarter panel
    - Shaker scoop
    - Spoiler
    - Subframe
    - Tonneau
  - Compartments
    - Trunk/Boot/Dickie
    - Hood/Bonnet
  - Doors
    - Butterfly doors
    - Canopy door
    - Gull-wing door
    - Scissor doors
    - Sliding doors
    - Suicide door
  - Glass
    - Greenhouse
    - Power window
    - Quarter glass
    - Sunroof
    - Windshield/Windscreen
    - Windshield/Windscreen wiper
  - Other
    - Bumper sticker
    - Curb feeler
    - Hood ornament
    - Japan Black paint
    - Monsoonshield
    - Nerf bar
    - Tire/Tyre
    - Tow hitch
    - Truck accessory
  - Lighting
    - Daytime running lamp
    - Headlamp
    - Hidden headlamps
    - High-intensity discharge lamps
    - Retroreflector
    - Sealed beam
    - Trafficators
  - Legal and other
    - Motor vehicle theft
    - Parking sensors
    - Vanity plate
    - Vehicle Identification Number
    - Vehicle registration plate
    - Vehicle horn • Windshield/Windscreen washer fluid
    - Wing mirror
  - Interior equipment
  - Instruments
    - Backup camera
    - Boost gauge
    - Buzzer
    - Carputer
    - Electronic instrument cluster
    - Fuel gauge
    - Global Positioning System and Automotive navigation system
    - Head-up display
    - Idiot light
    - Malfunction Indicator Lamp
    - Night vision
    - Odometer
    - Radar detector
    - LIDAR detector
    - Speedometer
    - Tachometer
    - Trip computer
  - Controls
    - Bowden cable
    - Cruise control
    - Electronic throttle control
    - Gear stick
    - Hand brake
    - Manettino dial
    - Steering wheel
    - Throttle
    - Brake
  - Theft deterrence
    - Automatic vehicle location
    - Car alarm
    - Immobiliser
    - Power door locks
    - VIN etching
  - Safety & seating
    - Airbag
    - Armrest
    - Automatic seat belts
    - Bench seat
    - Bucket seat
    - Child safety lock
    - Rumble seat
    - Seat belt
  - Other
    - Air conditioning
    - Automobile accessory power
    - Car audio
    - Car phone
    - Center console
    - Dashboard
    - Flat tire
    - Glove compartment
    - RF connector
    - Power steering
    - Rear-view mirror
    - Smart key
    - Sun visor
    - Trap (secret compartment)

== History of automobiles ==
History of the automobile

- History of steam road vehicles
- Cugnot's fardier à vapeur – an experimental steam-driven artillery tractor regarded by some as the first 'car'
- Benz Patent Motorwagen – First purpose-built automobile

== General automobile concepts ==
- Driving
  - Defensive driving
  - Energy-efficient driving
- Vehicle dynamics
  - Understeer and oversteer
  - Weight transfer
- Road traffic safety
  - Safety barrier
- Automobile safety
  - Active safety
  - Crash test
  - Crash test dummy
  - Crashworthiness
  - Side collision
  - Vehicle rollover
  - Traffic collision
  - Automobile safety rating
  - Car service
  - Mechanic
  - Auto mechanic
  - Work shop
  - Garage
  - Auto mechanic shop
  - Breakdown vehicle
  - Service motor vehicle

== Auto parts and systems ==
- Car engine
  - Basic terminology
    - Bore
    - Compression ratio
    - Crank
    - Cylinder
    - Dead centre
    - Diesel engine
    - Dry sump
    - Engine balance
    - Engine configuration
    - Engine displacement
    - Engine knocking
    - Firing order
    - Hydrolock
    - Petrol engine
    - Power band
    - Redline
    - Spark-ignition engine
    - Stroke
    - Stroke ratio
    - Wet sump
  - Main components
    - Connecting rod
    - Crankcase
    - Crankpin
    - Crankshaft
    - Crossflow cylinder head
    - Crossplane
    - Cylinder bank
    - Cylinder block
    - Cylinder head
    - Flywheel
    - Head gasket
    - Hypereutectic piston
    - Main bearing
    - Piston
    - Piston ring
    - Reverse-flow cylinder head
    - Starter ring gear
    - Sump
  - Valvetrain
    - Cam
    - Cam follower
    - Camshaft
    - Desmodromic valve
    - Hydraulic tappet
    - Multi-valve
    - Overhead camshaft
    - Overhead valve
    - Pneumatic valve springs
    - Poppet valve
    - Pushrod
    - Rocker arm
    - Sleeve valve
    - Tappet
    - Timing belt
    - Timing mark
    - Valve float
    - Variable valve timing
  - Aspiration
    - Air filter
    - Blowoff valve
    - Boost controller
    - Butterfly valve
    - Centrifugal type supercharger
    - Cold air intake
    - Dump valve
    - Electronic throttle control
    - Forced induction
    - Inlet manifold
    - Intake
    - Intercooler
    - Manifold vacuum
    - Naturally aspirated engine
    - Ram-air intake
    - Scroll-type supercharger
    - Short ram air intake
    - Supercharger
    - Throttle
    - Throttle body
    - Turbocharger
    - Twin-turbo
    - Variable geometry turbocharger
    - Variable length intake manifold
    - Warm air intake
  - Fuel system
    - Carburetor
    - Common rail
    - Direct injection
    - Fuel filter
    - Fuel injection
    - Fuel pump
    - Fuel tank
    - Gasoline direct injection
    - Indirect injection
    - Injection pump
    - Lean burn
    - Unit Injector
  - Electrics, ignition and
    engine management
    - Air-fuel ratio meter
    - Alternator
    - Automatic Performance Control
    - Car battery
    - Contact breaker
    - Crank sensor
    - Distributor
    - Dynamo
    - Drive by wire
    - Electrical ballast
    - Electronic control unit
    - Engine control unit
    - Glow plug
    - High tension leads
    - Ignition coil
    - Lead–acid battery
    - Ignition magneto
    - Mass flow sensor
    - Oxygen sensor
    - Spark plug
    - Starter motor
  - Exhaust system
    - Automobile emissions control
    - Catalytic converter
    - Diesel particulate filter
    - Exhaust manifold
    - Glasspack
    - Muffler
  - Engine cooling
    - Air cooling
    - Antifreeze
    - Core plug
    - Electric fan
    - Ethylene glycol
    - Fan belt
    - Radiator
    - Thermostat
    - Water cooling
    - Viscous fan
  - Other components
    - Balance shaft
    - Block heater
    - Combustion chamber
    - Cylinder head porting
    - Gasket
    - Motor oil
    - Oil filter
    - Oil pump
    - Oil sludge
    - PCV valve
    - Seal
    - Synthetic oil
    - Underdrive pulleys
- Powertrain
  - Hybrid powertrains
    - Hybrid vehicle drivetrain
  - Transmission
    - Automatic transmission
    - Clutch
    - Continuously variable transmission
    - Differential
    - Drive shaft
    - Dual-clutch transmission
    - Automated manual transmission
    - Electrorheological clutch
    - Epicyclic gearing
    - Fluid coupling
    - Gear stick
    - Limited-slip differential
    - Locking differential
    - Manual transmission
    - Manumatic
    - Parking pawl
    - Semi-automatic transmission
    - Torque converter
    - Transaxle
    - Transmission control unit
    - Universal joint
- Suspension
  - Anti-roll bar (sway bar)
  - Axle
  - Axle track
  - Beam axle
  - Camber angle
  - Car handling
  - Coil spring
  - De Dion tube
  - Double-wishbone
  - Hydragas
  - Hydrolastic
  - Hydropneumatic
  - Independent suspension
  - Leaf spring
  - Live axle
  - MacPherson strut
  - Multi-link suspension
  - Panhard rod
  - Shock absorber
  - Swing axle
  - Toe angle
  - Torsion bar
  - Trailing arm
  - Unsprung mass
  - Watt's linkage • Wheel alignment
  - Wheelbase
- Steering
  - Ackermann steering geometry
  - Caster angle
  - Kingpin
  - Oversteer
  - Power steering
  - Rack and pinion
  - Torque steering
  - Understeer
- Brakes
  - Advanced emergency braking system
  - Anti-lock Braking System (ABS)
  - Brake bleeding
  - Brake fade
  - Brake fluid
  - Brake lining
  - Disc brake
  - Drum brake
  - Electronic Brakeforce Distribution
  - Electronic Stability Control
  - Engine braking
  - Hydraulic brake
  - Hydraulic fluid
  - Inboard brake
  - Parking brake
  - Regenerative brake
  - Vacuum servo
- Roadwheels and tires (tyres)
  - Outline of tires
  - Alloy wheel
  - Custom wheel
  - Drive wheel
  - Hubcap
  - Rostyle wheel
  - Spinner
  - Wire wheels
- Automobile safety technology
  - Airbag
  - Anti-lock braking system
  - Crumple zone
  - Collision avoidance system
  - Emergency brake assist
  - Electronic stability control
  - Traction control system
  - Seat belt

== See also ==
- CarDomain (an online community site for car enthusiasts)
- Outline of bicycles

Automobile lists

- Lists of automobiles
- List of auto parts
- List of automobiles by sales
- List of countries by automobile production
- List of car brands
- List of automobile manufacturers
- List of solar car teams
- List of military armoured cars
- List of sports car manufacturers
