= Glossary of automotive terms =

List of definitions of terms and concepts related to automobiles

This glossary of automotive terms is a list of definitions of terms and concepts related to automobiles, including their parts, operation, and manufacture, as well as automotive engineering, auto repair, and the automotive industry in general. For more specific terminology regarding the design and classification of various automobile styles, see Glossary of automotive design; for terms related to transportation by road, see Glossary of road transport terms; for competitive auto racing, see Glossary of motorsport terms.

== A ==
accelerator

A throttle in the form of a foot-operated pedal, or sometimes a hand-operated lever or paddle, by which the flow of air or fuel to the engine (and thus the engine speed) is controlled, with depression of the pedal causing the vehicle to accelerate. For most gasoline-powered engines, depressing the accelerator opens the throttle valve, either by a mechanical cable or an electronic control unit, which directly increases air intake and indirectly the amount of fuel supplied via a carburetor or fuel injector. By contrast, diesel engines do not restrict airflow and so the accelerator pedal in a diesel vehicle directly controls the amount of fuel supplied to the engine.
admission stroke
See induction stroke.
aftermarket
air brake
1. A type of brake in which the force that actuates the brake mechanism is provided by compressed air acting on a diaphragm within a brake chamber or servo. Such systems are used primarily in commercial vehicles.
2. An aerodynamic spoiler designed to retard high-speed vehicles.
air curtain
A vent at each front corner of the body of a vehicle that directs airflow into the front wheel wells for improved aerodynamic performance.
airless injection

A type of fuel injection which relies on mechanical pressure only; the normal method of injection in a diesel engine.
all-wheel drive (AWD)
alternative fuel vehicle
alternator
A small electrical generator that converts mechanical energy into electrical energy in the form of alternating current, typically by using the engine to drive the rotation of a magnet which induces a current in a stationary armature. This electrical energy is then stored in the battery.
anti-lock braking system (ABS)
antifreeze
Any chemical, commonly ethylene glycol, that is added to the cooling water of an engine in order to decrease its freezing point for winter operation, when ambient temperatures may be below the normal freezing point of water.
articulated vehicle
Any vehicle consisting of two or more usually separable wheeled units, such as a towing vehicle (e.g. a tractor unit) combined with a towed vehicle (e.g. a trailer or semi-trailer) that is often unpowered and carrying a load. Articulation is primarily in the steering mode, though some degree of horizontal axis articulation is usually also necessary to enable the combined tractor-trailer to negotiate road surface irregularities.
articulation
A measurement of the ability of a tire, wheel, or axle to move vertically (left tire up, right tire down, or vice versa) with respect to the chassis. It indicates the ease with which tires can stay in contact with the ground and thus retain traction.
automated manual transmission
automatic transmission
automotive design
automotive engineering
automotive fuse
axle
A horizontal transverse shaft or beam with spindles on which road wheels are mounted. There are many different types of axles, typically distinguished by their placement relative to the vehicle's center of mass and their intended use. Vehicles are often classified by the number of axles they possess.
axle ratio

== B ==
back-fire
An explosion of unburned or partially burned fuel that occurs in an exhaust or inlet system, rather than in the combustion chamber as intended.
backup camera
ball and socket

A type of mechanical joint in which a spherical end (the ball) moves freely within a recessed cavity of the same shape (the socket), commonly used in suspension and steering linkages.
battery
bell housing
The conical or bell-shaped casing that houses and protects the components connecting the transmission to the engine, including the flywheel and clutch for a manual transmission, or the flexplate and torque converter for an automatic transmission.
bench seat
A type of seating arrangement consisting of a continuous cushion that spans the full width of the vehicle's interior to accommodate multiple passengers side-by-side, as opposed to individual bucket seats, which are separated and contoured to accommodate a single occupant. Bench seats are commonly used for middle- and back-row seating in large passenger vehicles.
body-in-blue
brake
Any device designed to apply friction to a moving or moveable surface in order to slow it, stop it, or prevent it from moving, especially one that slows, stops, or prevents the rotation of one or more of the wheels of an automobile. Most wheeled vehicles are built with at least one brake for each wheel, which can be applied either independently of each other or, in four-wheeled vehicles, all at the same time, by depressing one or more foot-operated brake pedals or hand-operated levers. If the vehicle is already in motion, the act of applying the wheel brakes, known as braking, will ultimately cause the entire vehicle to slow or stop as the friction generated by the contact between the tires and the ground overcomes the vehicle's inertia. If the vehicle is stationary, the same brakes or a separate brake may also be applied to prevent the wheels from rotating while the vehicle is parked. There are many types of brakes which operate on a wide variety of physical principles. Modern automotive braking systems rely on a large and complex network of precisely controlled mechanisms in order to deliver optimal braking pressure for specific road conditions, to prevent brakes from locking and overheating, to reduce the amount of input required from the driver, and ultimately to maximize safety, efficiency, and durability.
brake balance

brake dive
See dive.
brake fade
brake fluid
brake light

brake pad

brake pedal
brake puck
See brake pad.
brake shoe
brake swept area
brake rotor
braking distance
braking system
breeches pipe
See Y pipe.
bucket seat
bullbar

bumper
A stiff, lightweight, often protruding bodywork structure spanning the front and rear ends of a vehicle and either attached to or integrated with the body panels that is designed to absorb the impact of minor front-end or rear-end collisions and thereby minimize repair costs to other parts of the vehicle. Modern bumpers often include foam or other compressible materials and ideally minimize mismatches between vehicle heights as well as protect pedestrians from injury.

== C ==
caliper

In a disc brake system, the mechanism that brings the brake pads to bear on disc by a clamping or pinching action.
camber angle
The angle between the plane defined by the circumference of the wheels and the vertical axis of the body or chassis of a vehicle, as viewed from the front or rear of the vehicle. If the top of the wheel is tilted outward, away from the body, the wheel is said to have positive camber; if the top is tilted inward, towards the body, it is said to have negative camber. Angled wheels are sometimes an intentional part of a vehicle's design, but most ordinary road vehicles are intended to have minimal or neutral camber (i.e. the wheels are completely parallel to the body and perpendicular to the road surface).
carburetor
carputer
A computer specifically designed to control and automate one or more operations or features of an automobile. On-board computers typically have architectures similar to those of standard PCs or mobile devices but are specialized to have a compact size and low power requirements. They may or may not be intended to be regularly accessible by the driver; some computers are simple control networks employed to monitor critical automotive systems for the purpose of on-board diagnostics, while newer vehicles often have more complex and multifarious computers designed to offer the driver a variety of precision controls while driving.
caster angle

The angular displacement of the steering axis from the vertical axis of a steered wheel, as seen from the side of the vehicle.
catalytic converter
center cap

center console

chassis

The structural lower part of a vehicle to which the running gear and body are attached, or more generally the main load-bearing framework which supports all of a vehicle's mechanical parts and other components and on which the body is mounted. Compare rolling chassis.
choke

A valve that restricts the amount of air entering an engine on the induction stroke, thereby enriching the fuel-to-air ratio for ease of starting and running, especially when the engine is cold.
clearance volume
The volume remaining in a cylinder above the piston when it reaches top dead center. See also swept volume.
clocking
Illegally tampering with a vehicle's odometer reading.
clockspring
clutch
cold cranking amp
cold inflation pressure
combustion chamber
The part of an internal combustion engine in which combustion occurs; in particular the space within a cylinder bounded by the top of the piston when at top dead center and the cylinder head in a reciprocating engine. Since most of the fuel/air mixture's combustion takes place in this space, its volume, shape, and design greatly affect the power, fuel efficiency, and emissions of the engine.
compression ratio
The ratio between the maximum and minimum combined volume of an internal combustion engine's cylinder and combustion chamber.
continuously variable transmission (CVT)
coolant
Any substance, usually a liquid, that is circulated around a vehicle's engine in order to reduce and regulate temperature by absorbing excess heat and then transferring it to another medium (e.g. the surrounding air) where it is safely and efficiently dissipated. An ideal automotive coolant has high thermal capacity, low viscosity, and is chemically inert and non-toxic; though specific properties can vary widely by intended usage, most ordinary personal vehicles use water as the base coolant with additives such as ethylene glycol or methanol to lower its freezing point, raise its boiling point, and prevent corrosion.
cornering
cowling
The removable covering of a vehicle's engine, designed to shelter engine parts from dirt, debris, and water while still permitting airflow and heat dissipation.
crankcase
The housing that surrounds the crankshaft.
crankshaft
A linear shaft that translates reciprocating motion created by the pistons of an engine into rotational motion via a series of "crank throws" or "crankpins" – additional bearing surfaces which are slightly offset from that of the shaft and which are attached to the connecting rods of the pistons. The crankshaft is often attached to a flywheel and vibrational dampers to reduce the pulsation characteristic of four-stroke cycles and other undesirable movement.

A flat-plane crankshaft (red) is turned by the forward-and-back motion of four pistons (grey) as they move within the engine's cylinders (blue)

crankshaft journal
The part of the crankshaft that rotates in a main bearing, with connecting rods attached to the engine's pistons.
crankshaft throw

The lateral distance between the centerline of the crankshaft and the furthest offset of a big end journal, equivalent to half the length of a piston stroke; i.e. the distance by which the journals are offset from the main shaft.
crossfiring
crossflow cylinder head
crossmember
curb weight
See kerb weight.

== D ==
dashboard

The surface or panel at the front of the interior of a vehicle, positioned directly ahead of the driver and below the windshield, which displays various instruments and controls for the vehicle's operation. In some usages it may also include the center console.
differential
A system of gears capable of dividing the input torque of one shaft between two output shafts where the two shafts are likely to rotate at different speeds, as in cornering. The differential is used as the final drive of vehicles with two or more driven wheels.
dipstick
See oil level indicator.
disc brake
dispersant

A motor oil additive which separates and holds solid or liquid contaminants in suspension, preventing their settling or clumping and thereby reducing sludge deposition in the engine.
displacement
The total volume swept by all of the pistons in all of the cylinders of an internal combustion engine, excluding the volume of the combustion chambers. Engine displacement is commonly used as a measure of an engine's size, and by extension as an indicator of the power the engine is hypothetically capable of producing and the amount of fuel it can be expected to consume.
displacement factor
An index of vehicle performance usually expressed as the product of the engine displacement and axle ratio divided by the product of the drive wheel rolling ratio and the vehicle's gross weight.
dive
The dipping of a vehicle's front end that occurs when the brakes are applied. Dive is caused by a load transfer from the rear to the front suspension, as the inertial force of forward motion passes through the vehicle's center of gravity, which is higher than the points where the braking forces are exerted on the ground.
donut
See spare tire.
drive axle

The axle or axles used to transmit torque from the drivetrain, imparted via a differential, to one or more drive wheels; a driven axle.
drive shaft

The shaft or shafts by which mechanical power and torque is transmitted from the rest of the drivetrain to a differential (and hence to a driven axle and driven wheels).
drive wheel
The wheel or wheels used to transform torque from the powertrain into tractive force, and to transmit that force from the tires to the road, overcoming stationary forces and causing the vehicle to move forwards or backwards; i.e. the wheels that are driven, as opposed to merely rolling under the momentum imparted to them. Vehicles may have any combination of driven wheels; power applied to the two front wheels or two back wheels is two-wheel drive (2WD), and power applied to all four wheels is four-wheel drive (4WD). Which wheels are driven is variable in all-wheel drive (AWD).
drivebox
See gearbox and transmission.
drivetrain

All of the components of a motor vehicle that are involved in delivering power to the drive wheels, excluding the engine or motor that generates the power. The drivetrain typically includes the clutch (if present), transmission, drive shaft, differential, and one or more axles. Contrast powertrain.
drop arm
See steering arm.
drum brake
dry clutch
dynamometer

== E ==
econometer
An instrument that measures and displays instantaneous fuel consumption or fuel efficiency.
economizer

Any device or system designed to reduce fuel consumption by preventing unnecessary energy expenditure or by repurposing energy that would otherwise be wasted to perform useful functions. The term commonly refers specifically to a system that automatically modifies the ratio of the air/fuel mixture supplied to the engine in order to save fuel when cruising at constant speed.
electric vehicle
electronic control unit (ECU)

engine block
The structure, typically cast in one piece, which contains and houses the cylinders, pistons, and other components of an internal combustion engine. Modern engine blocks usually also have an integrated crankcase, as well as coolant passages and oil galleries.
engine configuration
The physical layout, arrangement, or design of an automotive engine's cylinders and major internal components, in particular describing the total number of cylinders present and their orientation and position relative to each other within the engine block. Common engine configurations include a straight-six, which has six cylinders arranged in a straight line along the crankshaft, and a V8, with eight cylinders in two rows oriented at angles to the crankshaft, forming a "V" shape.
exhaust manifold
exhaust system
The assembly of parts that conveys the gaseous products of the engine's combustion reactions (collectively known as exhaust) out of the combustion chambers, away from the engine, and ultimately into the atmosphere. In the most basic design, exhaust gases flow from each of the cylinder heads into an exhaust manifold and then through one or more exhaust pipes, which expel their contents behind, above, or to the side of the vehicle. In modern systems, the exhaust may also flow through a turbocharger, various emissions control devices (e.g. a catalytic converter), and/or a muffler and resonator (to reduce noise and vibration) before exiting through one or more tailpipes.

== F ==
fan belt
The endless belt that transmits rotational motion from the engine to the cooling fan.
fender
1. The fixed part of a vehicle body exterior that frames the wheel well, with the primary purpose of blocking sand, mud, rocks, liquids, and other road spray that is thrown into the air by the rotating tire; or any deflector plate or structure mounted at the front or rear of a vehicle near ground level.
2. A fixed side-panel that partially shrouds a tire from view and similarly serves to deflect road spray.
fifth-wheel coupling
firing order
The numbered sequence in which the cylinders of a multi-cylinder internal combustion engine are ignited.
flat engine
flathead engine
footprint
The shape of the contact interface of a loaded tire with the ground. See also contact length.
footwell
The lower interior part of the scuttle, which accommodates the feet of the driver and the front passenger, as well as the foot pedals and often other control features on the driver's side.
four-stroke engine
four-wheel drive (4WD)
A drivetrain system in which torque generated by the engine is delivered simultaneously to all four wheels of a four-wheeled vehicle. Thus all four wheels are drive wheels, as opposed to two-wheel drive, in which only one pair of wheels receives power at a time (either the front or rear wheels). Four-wheel drive can provide greater traction when road conditions are suboptimal, but typically has negative effects on fuel efficiency and handling at speed. It may be either permanent or selectable on-demand; in the latter case it is often referred to as all-wheel drive.
frame
The main structural foundation or "skeleton" of a motor vehicle, to which all other components are attached, and which is designed to physically support all of the vehicle's parts and systems (engine, transmission, suspension, steering, brakes, exterior body, etc.) and withstand both the stresses of static loads including the weight of passengers and cargo as well as dynamic forces such as acceleration, sudden braking, cornering, longitudinal torsion, and impacts from collisions. The term is often used interchangeably with chassis.
friction clutch
A type of clutch in which torque is transmitted by pressure of the clutch faces on each other.
front-wheel drive (FWD)
A two-wheel drive drivetrain system in which torque generated by the engine is delivered only to the two wheels at the forward end of the vehicle, as opposed to rear-wheel drive and distinct from four-wheel drive.

== G ==
gas pedal
See accelerator.
gearbox
1.

The system of gears that comprise a vehicle's transmission and enable the vehicle to move at a wide range of speeds by altering how the torque and speed of the engine are translated to the drive axles. The term is often used as a synonym for transmission, especially for vehicles with manual transmissions.
2.

The metal housing in which the gears of the transmission are physically enclosed and sealed.
gear stick
glove compartment

A compartment built into the dashboard of an automobile above the front-seat passenger's footwell, often used to store miscellaneous items such as small tools and paperwork and, traditionally, driving gloves. The compartment usually closes with a latch and in some vehicles can be locked with a key.
glow plug
governor

A device which limits the maximum rotational speed of an internal combustion engine, usually by controlling the fuel supply, in order to prevent mechanical damage, overheating, or unacceptable levels of exhaust emissions. They are used primarily in diesel engines.
gradeability
A measure of the ability of a vehicle to ascend an incline of a specified grade.
grille
A grid or grating covering an opening in the body of a vehicle and allowing air to pass through it, especially an ornamental one at the front end of a vehicle designed to ventilate the radiator and engine compartment.
gross axle weight

The specified maximum carrying capacity of an axle, as measured at the tire–road interface.
gross power
The total measured power output, typically expressed in watts or horsepower, of an intact, unmodified engine operating in optimal conditions without the burden of any power-absorbing auxiliaries such as electric generators, pumps, or silencers.
gross train weight
The total combined weight of the tractor and trailer of a commercial vehicle.
gross vehicle weight (GVW)
The maximum total weight at which a vehicle can be legally operated, including the kerb weight plus the weight of any payload.
ground clearance
The amount of space between the ground and a given part on an automobile, especially a part in the undercarriage; when reported for the whole vehicle, it is usually measured as the shortest distance between a flat, level surface and the lowest part of the unmodified, unladen vehicle (i.e. without passengers or cargo) other than those parts designed to contact the ground (i.e. not including the tires), which is typically the bottom exterior of the differential housing. High ground clearance is common in trucks and in vehicles designed to travel over uneven terrain, such as off-road vehicles, where a distinction is sometimes made between under-axle and underbelly clearance.

== H ==
handbrake
Any brake operated manually by a hand lever, but especially a parking brake.
handling
headlamp

An electric lamp attached to the front of a vehicle, typically in pairs, in order to illuminate the road ahead. Using headlamps can substantially improve visibility in low-visibility driving conditions, such as during poor weather or at nighttime.
headlight
The beam of light produced by and projected forward from a headlamp. The term is often used interchangeably with headlamp, though the latter more specifically refers to the light-producing device itself.
heat soak

The undesirable transfer of residual heat from high-mass, high-temperature engine parts into surrounding parts, fluids, electronics, or other components of the engine bay in the absence of active cooling mechanisms which normally dissipate this excess heat while the vehicle is running. Most notably, this occurs immediately after the engine is turned off, when the forced convection that normally facilitates under-hood airflow stops and the water pump ceases to circulate coolant, allowing excess thermal energy that continues to radiate from the still-hot engine block, exhaust manifold, and catalytic converters to "soak" into nearby parts, including temperature-sensitive gaskets, seals, plastic housings, and even fuel lines and the coolant itself. Heat soak can also be problematic for vehicle performance during active operation, particularly in turbocharged or supercharged engines, when components such as the intake manifold, airbox, or intercooler absorb excessive ambient heat, which increases the temperature and decreases the density of the intake air, causing a noticeable reduction in engine power.
hidden headlamp

A style of headlamp on some vehicles which allows the headlamps to be retracted and concealed when they are not in use.
hood

The hinged cover over the engine compartment of a motor vehicle. Hoods can be opened to allow access to the engine and most other power and accessory components for maintenance and repair.
horsepower (hp)
hub
The central portion of a wheel, by which the wheel is fastened to the vehicle's chassis.
hubcap

A round plastic or metal disk which covers all or part of the exterior face of a wheel, particularly the central hub, in order to protect the fasteners which attach the wheel to the vehicle's chassis from dirt and moisture. Hubcaps are often decorative.
hybrid vehicle

== I ==
idle port
An opening in the throttle body through which the carburetor dispenses fuel while the engine is idling, i.e. while the throttle is otherwise fully closed.
idle speed

The rotational speed of an unloaded engine at the minimum throttle setting.
idler arm
idling
Running a vehicle's engine while the vehicle is not in motion, without any loads except the engine accessories, e.g. while waiting at a traffic light.
ignition coil
In spark-ignition systems, an induction coil or electrical transformer that converts the relatively low-voltage direct current (typically 12 volts) supplied by the vehicle's battery into the high-voltage electrical pulses (sometimes as high as 50,000 volts) necessary for the spark plugs to create effective ignition sparks capable of igniting the engine's fuel-air mixture.
ignition switch
inline engine

An internal combustion engine layout in which all cylinders are aligned in one row without any offset, i.e. in a single plane of the crankshaft axis. Inline layouts tend to be simpler in design and easier to build than flat or V-shaped layouts, smaller in physical dimension, and more broadly compatible with various engine designs because they can be mounted in any direction.
instrument panel

A layout of dials, gauges, indicators, tell-tale lights, and other visual displays, whether analog or digital, that deliver essential information from various automotive systems and sensors to the driver in order to help the driver monitor the vehicle's performance and vital operating conditions in real time. Usually mounted within the dashboard immediately behind the steering wheel, the instrument panel typically houses gauges indicating instantaneous vehicle speed, engine speed, engine temperature, distance traveled, fuel capacity, fuel economy, oil pressure, and battery voltage, among others. It may also include a wide variety of symbols and icons that display information about the current status of vehicle systems (e.g. turn signals, parking brakes, and gear position indicators) and/or warning lights which illuminate to notify the driver when important systems are malfunctioning or require maintenance (e.g. check engine lights and service reminders), when certain non-essential features are in use (e.g. traction control or anti-lock braking systems), or when unsafe conditions may be present (e.g. door ajar indicators and seatbelt indicators).
intake manifold

internal combustion engine
Italian tuneup
A slang term for attempting to restore engine performance by driving a car at high engine speed (rpm) and load. The term originated from Italian mechanics in the 1950s using this practice to burn off carbon deposits from the spark plugs of sports cars. The practice is sometimes used prior to emissions testing, particularly for diesel engines.

== J ==
jacking bracket
jump lead

One of a pair of heavy-duty electrical leads by which a vehicle with a discharged battery may be connected to an external source of power, such as a charged battery in another vehicle, in order to recharge the dead battery, a process known as a jump start.
jump start

A procedure of starting the engine of a vehicle with a discharged or depleted battery by using jump leads from a charged battery or other external power source.

== K ==
kerb weight

The total mass of an unladen vehicle including standard equipment and all consumables necessary for operation, including water, motor oil, transmission fluid, brake fluid, coolant, etc., and (sometimes) a full tank of fuel, but excluding passengers and cargo. The precise definition varies by location. Compare gross vehicle weight.
keyless entry
kickdown

A system that enables a driver to select a lower gear than the one automatically engaged by an automatic transmission, e.g. when accelerating rapidly, usually by depressing the accelerator pedal fully.
kingpin

1. The vertical or inclined shaft about which a steered wheel assembly pivots.
2. The main fastening member between a fifth-wheel and semi-trailer.
knock rating
See octane rating.
knocking
knockout axle
A type of detachable axle, usually on a low-loader, the removal of which allows further lowering of the loading bed.

== L ==
leaf spring
lifting axle
limited-slip differential
locking differential
longitudinal engine
lugnut

== M ==
main drive belt
See serpentine belt.
make
The manufacturer of a particular vehicle.
manual transmission
manumatic
marque
model
The specific style, size, and/or type of a particular vehicle produced by a particular manufacturer; the set of features and design elements which unify a particular class of vehicles produced by a manufacturer. See also marque.
moonroof
motor oil

Any of various viscous liquids used to lubricate the mechanical components of an internal combustion engine, with the primary purposes of reducing friction and wear on moving parts, cleaning and preventing the accumulation of sludge and varnish, improving the static seal created by gaskets and piston rings, and cooling the engine by carrying heat away from the moving parts. Modern commercial motor oils typically consist of a mixture of base oils produced from crude petroleum and enhanced with various additives, including detergents, dispersants, and other chemical protectants, which is then circulated under pressure through oil galleries in the engine block.
muffler
multivalve engine
An engine having more than the conventional one intake valve and one exhaust valve in each cylinder, a design intended to increase the flow of fuel-air mixture into the cylinders and of exhaust gases out of them.

== N ==
nave
1. The hollow or dished center part of a road wheel on which the rim is mounted.
2. The face of a road wheel that is bolted to the hub.
nave cap
See hub cap.
neutral (N)
A gear selector position in which no gear is engaged, such that there is no transmission of torque between the input and output shafts of the gearbox. The neutral position effectively disconnects the driveline between the engine and the wheels. Power may still be generated by the engine, but it cannot be delivered to the wheels; unless braking prevents it, the wheels of a vehicle in neutral are still capable of rotating in either direction under the momentum imparted by any external force.
north-south
Describing an engine layout in which the cylinders are arranged along the vehicle's longitudinal axis, from front to rear, as opposed to an east-west layout.
noseweight

== O ==
octane rating
odometer

An instrument (variously electronic, mechanical, or both) that measures the distance traveled by a vehicle in real time in units such as miles or kilometers and then displays this information via a counter in the dashboard instrument panel. It is primarily used to record the total distance traveled by the vehicle during its lifespan, but may also be capable of recording interval distances between a user-defined starting point and end point.
off-road vehicle
Any vehicle capable of or specifically designed for traveling on unpaved, uneven, and/or low-traction surfaces such as gravel, sand, mud, snow, rocks, or other natural terrain, especially a vehicle having four-wheel drive, long suspension, high ground clearance, and specialized tires such that it performs well on these surface types, with lesser risk of being damaged or immobilized than an ordinary street vehicle.
oil filter
A filter designed to trap and remove particulate contaminants from engine oil, transmission oil, hydraulic oil, or any other lubrication system.
oil gallery
Any space or passage within an engine block, crankcase, or cylinder head through which oil is intended to flow under pressure.
oil gauge
An instrument that measures and displays the instantaneous pressure and/or temperature of the oil circulating within a lubrication system, especially engine oil.
oil level indicator

A long, flexible metal rod with graduated markings that is manually inserted into and then removed from the motor oil reservoir in order to give an approximate measure of the amount of oil in the reservoir.
oil pan
oil pump
An electrically powered device which pressurizes and distributes oil to all parts of a lubrication system. When not otherwise qualified the term usually refers to the engine oil pump.
on-board diagnostics (OBD)
overdrive
overhead valve engine (OHV)
overspeed governor
See governor.
oversteer

== P ==
parking brake

A mechanism used to keep a vehicle securely motionless when parked, generally consisting of a cable connecting two conventional wheel brakes (usually on the rear wheels) to a pulling mechanism in the vehicle's cab, typically either a hand-operated lever or handle located near the steering column or a foot-operated pedal near the other pedals.
piston
The primary moving component of an internal combustion engine, whose purpose is to receive the force generated by the rapid expansion of gases ignited in the combustion chamber and transfer it to the crankshaft via a piston rod and/or connecting rod, thereby converting reciprocating linear motion into rotational motion. Automobile engines typically employ four or more pistons, each housed within a cylinder, encircled by pressure-tight piston rings to seal the adjacent combustion chamber, and acting simultaneously upon the same crankshaft, out-of-phase with each other yet carefully synchronized so as to produce smooth, continuous motion. In many modern engines, the pistons also function as valves by alternately covering and uncovering intake and exhaust ports in the cylinders during each combustion cycle.
platform
A set of common design, engineering, and production efforts, as well as major automotive components, shared between a number of outwardly distinct vehicle models and even different vehicle classes which are often manufactured by different though usually related marques. Auto manufacturers commonly introduce new models based on existing platforms in order to reduce the costs associated with the development of entirely new products.
play

Free movement or looseness within a mechanical system, especially when not intended by the mechanism's design, e.g. any motion of a steering wheel before the steered wheels respond by turning.
power locks
power steering

The use of a power source (typically hydraulic or electrohydraulic) to indirectly control a mechanical steering system and thereby assist steering by reducing the amount of effort necessary to turn the steering wheel.
power stroke

The stroke of a reciprocating engine during which the piston is forced outward by the immense pressure generated by the combustion of fuel in the combustion chamber, typically considered to include that part of the cycle during which the piston moves from top dead center to bottom dead center.
power windows
powertrain
All of the systems and components of a motor vehicle that generate and transmit the power that propels the vehicle; i.e. the power source plus the drivetrain, considered collectively. The powertrain includes the engine or electric motors, transmission, drive shaft, differentials, and one or more drive axles.
powertrain control module (PCM)

== R ==
rack and pinion
A type of linear actuator comprising a circular gear (the pinion) engaging a linear gear (the rack), which operate together to translate rotational motion into linear motion or vice versa: rotating the pinion causes the rack to be driven linearly, and driving the rack linearly causes the pinion to rotate. Rack-and-pinion mechanisms have been employed in many different automotive systems and components, as in rack-and-pinion steering.
radiator
A heat exchanger that serves to cool the engine block by pumping spent coolant (previously heated by the engine) through a system of tubes which are then exposed to relatively cool air from the vehicle's exterior, often by way of a fan blowing air over them, thereby transferring excess thermal energy from the engine to the air.
radiator fan
One or more sets of fan blades situated behind the grille which serve to move air from the exterior around the tubes of the radiator, thereby dissipating heat from the engine block.
rearview mirror
A small, flat mirror located centrally inside the cab of a vehicle near the top of the windshield, designed to allow the driver to see rearward through the vehicle's rear window.
rear-wheel drive (RWD)
A two-wheel drive drivetrain system in which torque generated by the engine is delivered only to the two wheels at the rear end of the vehicle, as opposed to front-wheel drive and distinct from four-wheel drive.
redline
1. The maximum rotational speed, in revolutions per minute (rpm), at which an internal combustion engine or traction motor and its components are designed to operate without causing damage to the components themselves or to other parts of the engine assembly. The redline of a particular engine depends on various factors such as stroke, displacement, and the mass, composition, and balance of the engine components. The term is derived from the red-colored line or colored sector of a tachometer display which indicates the maximum allowable sustained engine speed.
2. To operate a vehicle above its engine's redline. Straying above the redline usually does not mean instant engine failure, but may increase the chances of damaging the engine.
remote keyless system (RKS)
remote start
roadworthy

Describing a vehicle which is in suitable operating condition to be safely used on public roads, in which all parts are mechanically sound such that no part contravenes accepted standards for safe driving or transport of people or cargo or any other road transport regulation. The term often implies that the vehicle is street-legal.
rolling ratio

== S ==
scuttle
semi-automatic transmission
siping
sludge

A thick, gelatinous, tar-like deposit that accumulates and persists on internal engine surfaces, primarily a mixture of carbonaceous residues from combustion (such as blow-by of unburned or partially burned fuel) and byproducts of the oxidation and thermal breakdown of crankcase lubricants (i.e. motor oil), combined with moisture from condensation, chemical additives, and various solids such as dirt and wear particles. If left uncleaned, it can cause excessive wear to engine parts and negatively impact performance. See also varnish.
soak time
solenoid switch
solid injection
See airless injection.
spare tire
spark ignition
A system that uses a high-voltage electrical arc or "spark" to ignite a fuel/air mixture.
spark plug
An insulated plug that supports the electrodes between which the electrical arc or "spark" passes to initiate ignition of a spark-ignition engine.
speedometer
A gauge that measures and displays the instantaneous speed of a vehicle. Universal in modern automobiles and typically mounted on the dashboard behind the steering wheel.
spoiler
steering column
steering wheel
A hand-operated wheel in front of the driver's seat used to control the direction of the vehicle's road wheels. Turning the steering wheel causes the steerable wheels (typically the two wheels attached to the front axle) to turn in the same direction.
stick shift
See manual transmission.
straight engine
See inline engine.
strangler
See choke.
street-legal
stroke
The movement of a piston as it travels from bottom dead center to top dead center or vice versa, or the distance covered by the piston during this movement. The internal combustion engines used in automobiles typically require either two or four separate strokes of the pistons to complete a power cycle.
subframe
A discrete, separate substructure within a larger frame or chassis, typically providing structural support for specific components such as the powertrain, drivetrain, and suspension. The subframe often includes rubber bushings or springs at the points of attachment to the chassis to help reduce noise and dampen vibrations.
sun visor
supercharger
suspension
A generic term to describe the undercarriage weight-handling, body height, load-leveling, and powertrain components of a 4x4. Typical suspension types include solid axle, four-link, and independent front suspension.

== T ==
tachometer
An instrument which measures the rotational speed of a shaft or disk, as of an engine, and/or the analogue dial or digital device which displays this measured speed, usually in revolutions per minute (RPM).
tailgate
tailpipe

The rearmost pipe of an exhaust system, downstream of the rear muffler, by which most or all of the vehicle's exhaust gases exit the system. The term is also sometimes used to refer to intermediate pipes. Large vehicles may have more than one tailpipe.
telematic control unit (TCU)
telematics
The range of electronic signals, displays, controls, and information provided to drivers so as to make driving easier and safer, whether inside the vehicle, on other vehicles, or on the roadside; or the interdisciplinary field that studies the implementation of these technologies. Examples include turn signals, brake lights, hazard lights, digital instrument panels, and any of the wide variety of features offered by onboard computer systems, such as turn-by-turn navigation and proximity sensors.
throttle
Any mechanism used to control the flow of a fluid such as air or fuel through a passage. In automobiles, this is usually a butterfly valve that can be opened or closed by the driver via a hand-operated mechanism or a foot-operated accelerator pedal to directly control the amount of airflow into the engine, which alters the air/fuel ratio and thereby the engine's speed or power output.
tie rod
tire

tire balance
tire pressure
tire rotation
The practice of periodically moving the wheels and tires of an automobile from one position to another on the same vehicle in order to ensure that all of the vehicle's tires receive approximately the same amount of wear over time; i.e. that no particular tire wears out more quickly than any other. This is a consequence of the fact that a tire's lifespan is often strongly biased by its particular position on the vehicle (e.g. front or rear, driver's side or passenger side) because the masses supported by and the forces applied to different parts of the vehicle are often uneven; for example, in front-engine vehicles, the front axle typically supports a much greater load than the rear axle, meaning the tires on its wheels experience different forces that may cause their tread to wear out faster than the tread on the rear tires.
torque
traction
traction control system (TCS)

trafficator
A retractable, often electronically illuminated semaphore used as a turn signal which, when operated, pivots laterally to protrude from the bodywork on either side of a vehicle to indicate its intention to turn in the direction of the signal. They were common in vehicles produced before the 1960s.
transaxle
transbrake
transfer case
transmission
transmission control unit (TCU)
transmission fluid
transmission tunnel
transverse engine
An engine mounted inside a vehicle so that the axis of the crankshaft is perpendicular to the direction of travel. This configuration is common in front-wheel drive passenger vehicles. Contrast longitudinal engine.
trim level
trunk

The primary storage or cargo compartment inside an automobile, especially a large interior space at the rear of the vehicle that is accessible from the exterior by one or more dedicated doors or hatches.
turbocharger
turn signal

Any signaling mechanism used to indicate to other road users the driver's intention to turn the vehicle in the direction suggested by the signal's position relative to the rest of the vehicle, i.e. to the right or to the left, commonly an amber light fixture positioned near each corner of the vehicle's body and sometimes also on the sides which, when operated by the driver, flashes repeatedly. Early vehicles often used signals which physically protruded from the bodywork, known as trafficators.
two-stroke engine
two-wheel drive (2WD)
A drivetrain system in which torque generated by the engine is delivered to only one pair of wheels at a time, either the two front or two rear wheels. Thus there are exactly two driven wheels, while the other two wheels merely roll under the momentum imparted to them and do not create tractive force of their own. This is in contrast to four-wheel drive (4WD), in which all four wheels receive power simultaneously. Some vehicles are only capable of two-wheel drive such that it is permanent, while in others it is a selectable mode, with the vehicle capable of switching between two-wheel drive and four-wheel drive on-demand.

== U ==
undercarriage
The wheels, axles, and suspension system of a vehicle, particularly a commercial vehicle; more generally, all of the parts of an automobile accessible from the underside of the vehicle.
underdrive pulley
understeer
unsprung mass

== V ==
V engine
valvetrain
vehicle identification number (VIN)

== W ==
wheel alignment
wheel speed sensor
wheel well
See fender.
wheelbase
The longitudinal distance between the front and rear wheel axes of a vehicle.
wheelfight
A rotary disturbance occurring in the steering wheel that is produced by forces acting on the steered wheels.
whistle tip
windshield

The front window of an automobile, providing visibility in the forward direction of travel while protecting the occupants from the elements. Modern windshields are usually made of laminated safety glass, consisting of two curved sheets of glass with a plastic layer laminated between them, which is bonded to the window frame.
windshield wiper
wing
British English for fender.
wing mirror
wiring harness

== Y ==
Y pipe

A two-branch exhaust manifold connecting the exhausts of a V engine to form a single exhaust.

== See also ==
- Glossary of automotive design
- Glossary of mechanical engineering
- Glossary of motorsport terms
- Glossary of road transport terms
- List of auto parts
- Outline of automobiles
