= 2006 Coca-Cola 600 =

12th race of 2006 NASCAR Nextel Cup series

Race details
- Race 12 of 36 in the 2006 NASCAR Nextel Cup Series
- 2006 Coca-Cola 600 program cover, with artwork by NASCAR artist Sam Bass. The painting is called "Coca-Cola 12 Pack!"
- Date: May 28, 2006
- Official name: Coca-Cola 600
- Location: Charlotte Motor Speedway, Concord, North Carolina
- Course: Permanent racing facility
- Course length: 1.5 miles (2.414 km)
- Distance: 400 laps, 600 mi (965.606 km)
- Weather: Chilly with temperatures reaching as low as 60.8 °F (16.0 °C); wind speeds up to 15 miles per hour (24 km/h)
- Average speed: 128.84 miles per hour (207.35 km/h)

Pole position
Driver	Scott Riggs	Evernham Motorsports
- Time: 28.744

Most laps led
Driver	Kasey Kahne	Evernham Motorsports
- Laps: 158

Winner
No. 9	Kasey Kahne	Evernham Motorsports

Television in the United States
- Network: Fox Broadcasting Company
- Announcers: Mike Joy, Darrell Waltrip, Larry McReynolds
- Nielsen ratings: 5.1/11 (Final); 4.7/10 (Overnight)

Radio in the United States
- Radio: Performance Racing Network
- Booth announcers: Mark Garrow, Doug Rice
- Turn announcers: Pat Patterson, Brent MacMillan, Chuck Carland

The 2006 Coca-Cola 600 was the 12th stock car race of the 2006 NASCAR Nextel Cup Series as well as the 47th running of the event. It was held on May 28, 2006, in Concord, North Carolina, at Lowe's Motor Speedway, before a crowd of 175,000 spectators. The circuit is an intermediate track that holds NASCAR races. Kasey Kahne of the Evernham Motorsports team won the 400-lap race starting from ninth position; Hendrick Motorsports driver Jimmie Johnson finished second and Roush Racing's Carl Edwards was third.

Scott Riggs won the second pole position of his career by posting the fastest lap in qualifying, and led 47 of the first 49 laps until Jeff Gordon overtook him on lap 50. The lead changed a total of 37 times, with Kahne leading the most laps of any competitor (158). At the final restart on the 368th lap, Edwards led the field and held off Johnson in the second position. Kahne turned left to pass them both and reclaim the lead three laps later. He extended his advantage to more than two seconds and claimed his third victory of the season and the fourth of his career. There were a total of fifteen cautions during the race, and sixteen different drivers each led at least one lap.

The result of the race advanced Kahne to sixth in the Drivers' Championship, 292 points behind Johnson. Roush Racing teammates Matt Kenseth and Mark Martin each finished in the top ten, and moved to second and third, respectively. Tony Stewart of Joe Gibbs Racing fell from second to fourth after crashing heavily on lap 34. In the Manufacturers' Championship, Chevrolet maintained its lead with 86 points, 14 points ahead of Ford in second, and 16 in front of Dodge (its first Coca-Cola 600 victory since 1977) in third, with 24 races left in the season.

== Background ==
Charlotte Motor Speedway, where the race was held.

The Coca-Cola 600 was the 12th of 36 scheduled stock car races of the 2006 NASCAR Nextel Cup Series, and the event's 47th iteration. It was held on May 28, 2006, in Concord, North Carolina, at Lowe's Motor Speedway (now Charlotte Motor Speedway), an intermediate track that holds NASCAR races. The standard layout is a 1.5 mi (2.4 km) four-turn quad-oval track. The track's turns are banked at twenty-four degrees; both the front stretch (the location of the finish line) and the back stretch (opposite the front) have a five-degree banking.

Before the race, Jimmie Johnson led the Drivers' Championship with 1,686 points, with Tony Stewart in second (1,593 points) and Matt Kenseth third (1,592 points). Mark Martin and Dale Earnhardt Jr. were fourth and fifth with 1,487 points and 1,460 points, respectively, and Jeff Gordon, Kyle Busch, Kasey Kahne, Kevin Harvick and Jeff Burton rounded out the top ten drivers in the points standings. In the Manufacturers' Championship, Chevrolet was leading with 80 points; Ford was second with 68 points, followed by Dodge with 61 points. Johnson was the race's defending champion. NASCAR mandated that teams used a 14 US gal (53 L; 12 imp gal) fuel cell instead of the standard 22 US gal (83 L; 18 imp gal) so that there would be fewer laps between pit stops and more tire changes could occur. Control tire supplier Goodyear brought a supply of harder compounds to ensure longevity.

The Coca-Cola 600 was conceived by driver Curtis Turner, who built the track. It was first held in 1960 in NASCAR's attempt to stage a Memorial Day weekend race to compete with the open-wheel Indianapolis 500; the two races were held together on the same day from 1974 onward. The race is the longest in distance on NASCAR's calendar, and is considered by drivers to be one of the sport's most important races alongside the Daytona 500, the Brickyard 400 and the Southern 500. It is NASCAR's most physically demanding event; teams adapt to changeable track conditions because it occurs between late afternoon and evening. It was known as the World 600 until 1984 when The Coca-Cola Company purchased the race's naming rights, renaming it the Coca-Cola World 600 in 1985. It has been called the Coca-Cola 600 every year since 1986, except for 2002 when the name changed to Coca-Cola Racing Family 600.

After the previous race at Charlotte (the 2005 UAW-GM Quality 500), the track's condition was beginning to deteriorate. Several cars sustained blown tires, and multiple crashes occurred on the worn bumpy surface due to levigation, a process where a circuit's hard bumps were smoothed out. When that did not work, the entire track (including the aprons and pit road) was completely repaved, with more than a 10,000 lb (4,500 kg) of asphalt used. The work was completed two months before the Coca-Cola 600 began.

== Practice and qualifier ==
Three practice sessions were held before the race; one on Thursday and two on Saturday. The first session on Friday afternoon lasted 90 minutes, the second on Saturday afternoon 60 minutes and the third held later that day ran for 45 minutes. In the first practice session, Greg Biffle was fastest with a lap of 29.693 seconds, ahead of Kahne in second and Kurt Busch in third. Jeremy Mayfield was fourth-fastest; Harvick placed fifth and Reed Sorenson came sixth. Jeff Green set the seventh-quickest time, Scott Riggs eighth, Kyle Busch ninth, and Travis Kvapil completed the top ten ahead of qualifying. Stewart spun leaving the second turn, but he avoided contact with the barrier beside the track. Tony Raines hit the wall, and his pit crew repaired minor structural damage to his car on pit road. J. J. Yeley pirouetted backward into the turn two wall late in the session. Robby Gordon's engine failed at around the same time, and his team changed engines.

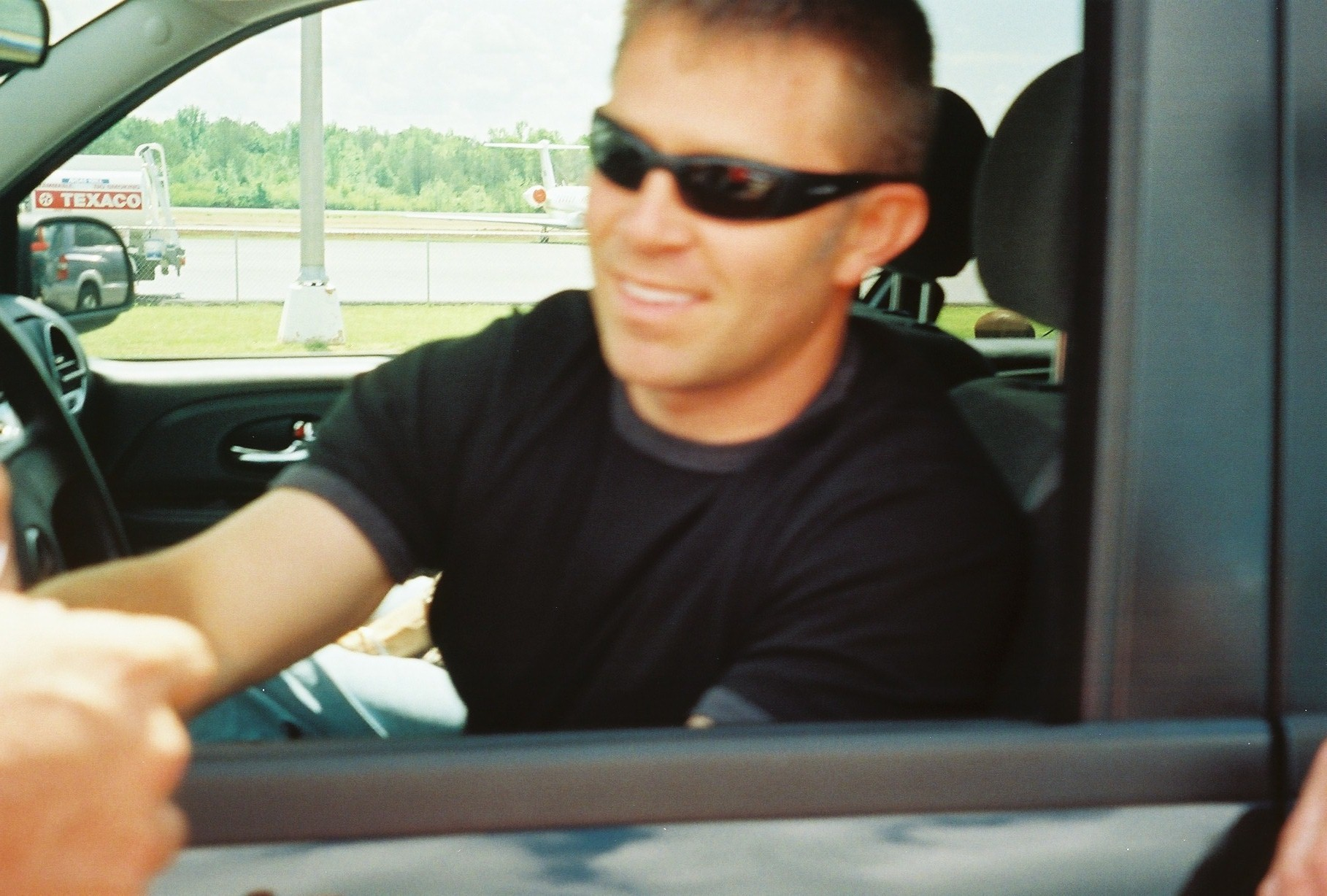
Scott Riggs (pictured in 2008) had the second pole position of his career.

Fifty-three cars were entered for the qualifying session on Thursday evening; according to NASCAR's qualifying procedure forty-three were allowed to race. Each driver ran two laps, with the starting order determined by the competitor's fastest times. Cars that ventured onto the track early in qualifying were at a disadvantage because the track temperatures lowered as night fell. Riggs was advised by his crew chief Rodney Childers to drive a different car, and he went onto the circuit in the middle of the session, taking his first pole position of the season, and the second of his career with a time of 28.744 seconds. He was joined on the grid's front row by Mayfield, his Evernham Motorsports teammate. Johnson qualified in third, Yeley fourth, and Bobby Labonte fifth. Kenseth was fifth, with Biffle and Denny Hamlin seventh and eighth. Kahne and Green were ninth and tenth. The nine drivers who failed to qualify were Kevin Lepage, Hermie Sadler, Chad Chaffin, Michael Waltrip, Stanton Barrett, Mike Garvey, Chad Blount, Carl Long, Kirk Shelmerdine and Kertus Davis. After the qualifier, Riggs praised his car, "There was a lot of grip out there tonight and I didn't know if it was going to hold up for pole or not, but I got all I could out of it. All these guys did a good job of making sure we didn't tune ourselves out of it. We just kept making small changes and everything worked out."

Although Waltrip failed to set a fast enough lap time to qualify, he brought Derrike Cope's No. 74 McGlynn Racing car to enter the race, and renumbered it as No. 55, allowing him to extend his streak of consecutive starts to 262 races. On Saturday afternoon Mayfield was fastest in the second practice session with a time of 30.199 seconds; Martin was second-fastest and Labonte third. Fourth place was occupied by Riggs and his teammate Kahne placed fifth. Green was sixth-fastest, and Johnny Sauter, Kurt Busch, Casey Mears and Carl Edwards followed in positions seven through ten. Later that day, Kahne led the final practice session, setting a lap of 30.257 seconds. Martin duplicated his second practice session result in second, with Mayfield third and Edwards improved to fourth. Edwards' teammate Biffle was fifth- quickest; Riggs took the sixth position and Labonte came seventh. Kurt Busch was eighth, Burton ninth and Yeley completed the top ten ahead of Sunday's race.

=== Qualifying results ===
Grid	No.	Driver	Team	Manufacturer	Time	Speed
1	10	Scott Riggs	Evernham Motorsports	Dodge	28.744	187.865
2	19	Jeremy Mayfield	Evernham Motorsports	Dodge	28.832	187.292
3	48	Jimmie Johnson	Hendrick Motorsports	Chevrolet	28.931	186.651
4	18	J. J. Yeley	Joe Gibbs Racing	Chevrolet	28.999	186.213
5	43	Bobby Labonte	Petty Enterprises	Dodge	29.015	186.111
6	17	Matt Kenseth	Roush Racing	Ford	29.029	186.021
7	16	Greg Biffle	Roush Racing	Ford	29.046	185.912
8	11	Denny Hamlin	Joe Gibbs Racing	Chevrolet	29.076	185.720
9	9	Kasey Kahne	Evernham Motorsports	Dodge	29.080	185.695
10	66	Jeff Green	Haas CNC Racing	Chevrolet	29.092	185.618
11	31	Jeff Burton	Richard Childress Racing	Chevrolet	29.100	185.567
12	29	Kevin Harvick	Richard Childress Racing	Chevrolet	29.104	185.542
13	24	Jeff Gordon	Hendrick Motorsports	Chevrolet	29.153	185.230
14	70	Johnny Sauter	Haas CNC Racing	Chevrolet	29.166	185.147
15	07	Clint Bowyer	Richard Childress Racing	Chevrolet	29.176	185.084
16	14	Sterling Marlin	MB2 Motorsports	Chevrolet	29.182	185.046
17	25	Brian Vickers	Hendrick Motorsports	Chevrolet	29.201	184.925
18	12	Ryan Newman	Penske Racing South	Dodge	29.262	184.540
19	01	Joe Nemechek	MB2 Motorsports	Chevrolet	29.266	184.514
20	2	Kurt Busch	Penske Racing South	Dodge	29.307	184.256
21	6	Mark Martin	Roush Racing	Ford	29.319	184.181
22	99	Carl Edwards	Roush Racing	Ford	29.353	183.968
23	41	Reed Sorenson	Chip Ganassi Racing	Dodge	29.356	183.949
24	44	Terry Labonte	Hendrick Motorsports	Chevrolet	29.360	183.924
25	40	David Stremme	Chip Ganassi Racing	Dodge	29.373	183.842
26	38	Elliott Sadler	Robert Yates Racing	Ford	29.405	183.642
27	1	Martin Truex Jr.	Dale Earnhardt, Inc.	Chevrolet	29.410	183.611
28	5	Kyle Busch	Hendrick Motorsports	Chevrolet	29.416	183.574
29	22	Dave Blaney	Bill Davis Racing	Dodge	29.421	183.542
30	42	Casey Mears	Chip Ganassi Racing	Dodge	29.423	183.530
31	32	Travis Kvapil	PPI Motorsports	Chevrolet	29.427	183.505
32	20	Tony Stewart	Joe Gibbs Racing	Chevrolet	29.531	182.859
33	26	Jamie McMurray	Roush Racing	Ford	29.585	182.525
34	8	Dale Earnhardt Jr.	Dale Earnhardt, Inc.	Chevrolet	29.612	182.359
35	78	Kenny Wallace	Furniture Row Racing	Chevrolet	29.636	182.211
36	15	Paul Menard	Dale Earnhardt, Inc.	Chevrolet	29.663	182.048
37	88	Dale Jarrett	Robert Yates Racing	Ford	29.673	181.984
38	4	Scott Wimmer	Morgan–McClure Motorsports	Chevrolet	29.674	181.977
39	45	Kyle Petty	Petty Enterprises	Dodge	29.704	181.784
40	21	Ken Schrader	Wood Brothers Racing	Ford	29.725	181.665
41	7	Robby Gordon	Robby Gordon Motorsports	Chevrolet	29.907	180.560^{1}
42	96	Tony Raines	Hall of Fame Racing	Chevrolet	29.995	180.030
43	74	Derrike Cope	McGlynn Racing	Dodge	29.696	181.143^{1}
Failed to qualify
44	49	Kevin Lepage	BAM Racing	Dodge	29.779	181.336
45	00	Hermie Sadler	MBA Racing	Ford	29.878	180.735
46	61	Chad Chaffin	Front Row Motorsports	Ford	29.981	180.114
47	55	Michael Waltrip	Waltrip-Jasper Racing	Dodge	30.018	179.892
48	95	Stanton Barrett	Stanton Barrett Motorsports	Chevrolet	30.056	179.665
49	51	Mike Garvey	Competitive Edge Motorsports	Chevrolet	30.248	178.524
50	34	Chad Blount	Front Row Motorsports	Chevrolet	30.299	178.224
51	37	Carl Long	R&J Racing	Dodge	30.560	176.702
52	27	Kirk Shelmerdine	Kirk Shelmerdine Racing	Chevrolet	31.266	172.712
53	72	Kertus Davis	CJM Racing	Dodge	—	—
^{1} Moved to the back of the field for changing engines (#7), and for a driver change (#55)

== Race ==
Live television coverage of the race began at 5:02 p.m. Eastern Daylight Time (EDT) (UTC–04:00) in the United States on Fox. Around the start of the race, weather conditions were sunny, with the air temperature in the high 80 °F (27 °C) range, and the track temperature was 113 °F (45 °C). Country music singer Carrie Underwood performed the national anthem introduced by American Idol host Ryan Seacrest, and Edward Angus Powell Jr., president and chief executive officer of the United Service Organizations, commanded the drivers to start their engines. During the pace laps, Robby Gordon fell to the rear of the grid because he changed engines, and Waltrip did the same for relieving Cope in the No. 74 McGlynn Racing car.

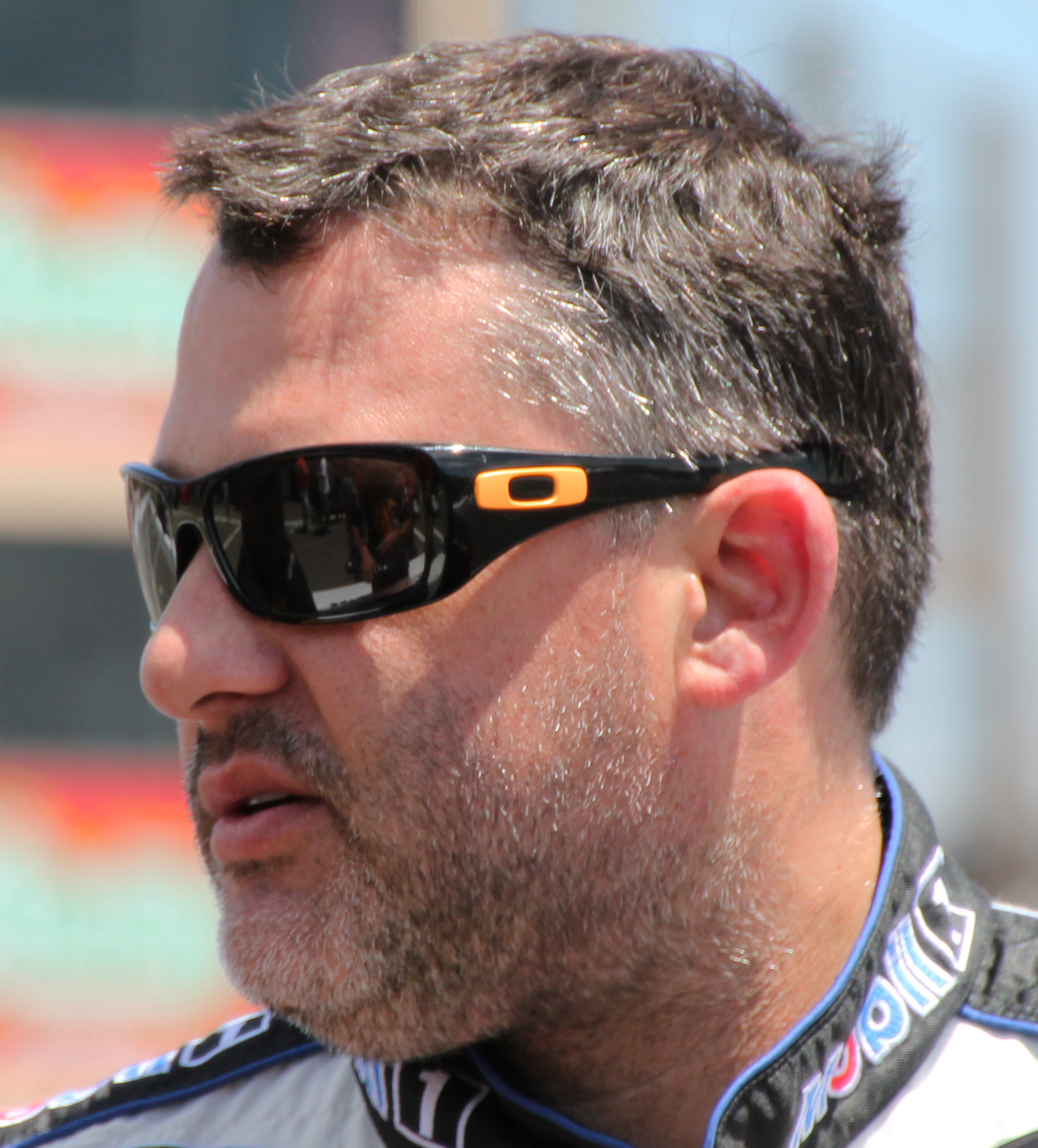
Tony Stewart (pictured in 2015) fractured the tip of his right scapula bone in a heavy accident on the 33rd lap.

The race began at 5:43 EDT. Riggs maintained his pole position advantage going into the first turn. That lap, the first caution was waved, as Dale Jarrett was told by his spotter Rick Cordell over the radio to maintain his line entering turn three. He mis-interpreted the command, and came down into Robby Gordon's right-front quarter panel. Jarrett spun backward into the turn three wall and retired from the event. Riggs held the lead on the lap five restart. Four laps later, Mayfield was passed by Johnson for second. On lap 33, Stewart's right-front tire disintegrated because the hot track surface melted its bead and he lost control of his car. He crashed heavily into the right-hand SAFER energy absorbing barrier at turn two, and the second caution was necessitated. Stewart required assistance from medical personnel to exit his car, and the internal pain meant he clutched his right shoulder while walking to an ambulance. During the caution, several drivers (including Riggs) made pit stops. Elliott Sadler and Waltrip staggered their pit stops, enabling the pair to lead a lap each before entering pit road. Riggs maintained the first position at the restart on lap 40. Newman's front tires went flat eight laps later, and spun at turn four, but avoided damaging his car, necessitating the third caution.

Several drivers (including Riggs) elected to make pit stops for fuel. Riggs stalled and lost the lead to Jeff Gordon who held it at the restart on lap 53. Fourteen laps later, the fourth caution was shown. Kurt Busch lost control of his car leaving the second turn, and he made contact with the barrier with the left-hand side of his car. Under caution, most of the drivers on the lead lap (including Jeff Gordon) entered pit road for fuel, tires and car adjustments. Johnson led the field back up to speed at the lap 71 restart. He began to pull away from the rest of the field. On lap 92, sections of metal were observed lying in turn two, and the fifth caution was subsequently waved. Several cars (including Johnson) again made pit stops during the caution. Kahne made two stops because a crew member dropped a lug nut. Riggs returned to hold the first position at the restart on lap 97. On the same lap, Green overtook Riggs for the lead. Vickers hit a wall on the 100th lap but no caution was prompted as he continued without major damage to his car. By lap 106, Martin had moved to second place. He took the lead from Green four laps later. Martin only held it for a lap as Green overtook him to return to the first position. On lap 112, Paul Menard spun leaving turn four, but avoided hitting a wall, causing the sixth caution. Most drivers (including Green) chose to make pit stops for fuel and tires.

Martin regained the lead and maintained it at the lap 116 restart. The seventh caution was necessitated fourteen laps later because of debris in turn two. Drivers again took the opportunity to make pit stops under caution. Edwards was sent to the end of the longest line for entering pit road while it was closed. Riggs retook the lead on the 131st lap by taking only fuel. He held it at the restart on lap 135. Ten laps later, an eighth caution was required, as one of Edwards' tires blew, and he hit the turn two wall lightly, before spinning on the backstretch. Most teams elected to put fuel in their cars under caution was active. Green was ordered to drop to the end of the longest line for his team leaving equipment outside his pit box. Biffle led at the lap 147 restart. Vickers had an understeer that caused him to spin into the turn four wall with his car's right-hand side on the 160th lap, causing the ninth caution to be displayed. Most drivers (including Biffle) made pit stops for fuel and tires during the caution. Hamlin became the leader for the lap 166 restart. On lap 181, Kahne got ahead of Hamlin and became the new leader. Green flag pit stops began on the 202nd lap. On the next lap, Bowyer exited his pit box without a catch can, and it fell off, causing the tenth caution. Most drivers chose to have four tires installed on their cars under caution. Kahne continued to lead at the restart on lap 210.

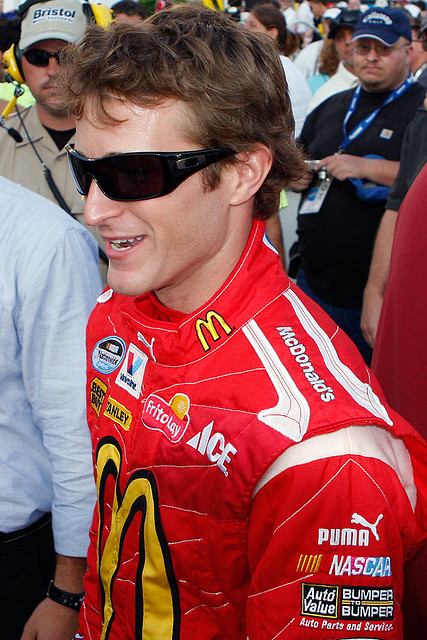
Kasey Kahne (pictured in 2007) led a race-high 158 laps for his fourth career victory.

Debris from Kvapil's shredded right-rear tire was located in the second turn 26 laps later, triggering the eleventh caution. The leaders (including Kahne) again elected to have four tires fitted to their cars during the caution. Hamlin got back to the first position, holding it at the lap 240 restart. On the following lap, Kahne passed Hamlin to regain the lead. Riggs and Mears then got past Hamlin to move into second and third three laps later. Four laps later, the twelfth caution was necessitated: Sauter's right-rear tire disintegrated exiting turn one, and he spun on the apron. Under caution, most of the leaders again took on fuel on pit road. Kahne continued to lead at the lap 254 restart. The second round of green flag pit stops commenced on the 287th lap, with Kahne maintaining the lead after all were completed nine laps later. A thirteenth caution was called for debris in turn two on lap 306. The leaders (including Kahne) again made pit stops for fuel and tires. Burton took the first position for the lap 310 restart. Four laps later, Mears lost control of his car in turn four, and bent his vehicle's rear bodywork and spoiler in a collision with a barrier. He turned down into Kyle Busch on the frontstretch, who was turned into the right-hand wall with his left-hand quarter, and slid into the infield grass, triggering the fourteenth caution.

Several cars swerved to avoid the accident. Kyle Busch put his window net down, and vacated his vehicle to venture towards the track while NASCAR officials restrained him. As one official grabbed his right arm, he threw his HANS device at Mears' circulating car on the next lap, which ricocheted off it. Racing resumed on the 321st lap, with Kahne leading. Riggs passed his teammate Kahne for the lead sixteen laps later. The final round of green flag pit stops began on lap 361. Riggs stalled twice and he incurred a stop-and-go penalty for transporting a jack and fuel can outside of his pit box. On lap 363, Jeff Gordon's right-rear suspension failed, and he collided with the turn four wall, causing the fifteenth (and final) caution. Edwards led at the lap 368 restart. He held off Johnson but lost the lead to Kahne to his left between turns three and four three laps later. Kahne held a lead of two seconds, and took his third victory of the season, and the fourth of his career. Johnson finished second, Edwards third, Martin fourth and Kenseth fifth. Burton, Biffle, Jamie McMurray, Hamlin and Sorenson completed the top ten. There were 37 lead changes amongst 16 different drivers during the course of the race. Kahne's 158 laps led was the most of any driver.

=== Post-race comments ===
Tonight was ours! To win in Charlotte is huge! You know every race at [Lowe's], Jimmie Johnson is going to be the guy to beat! We finally made it to that point and were able to race him!

— Kasey Kahne on ending Jimmie Johnson's streak of four consecutive victories at Lowe's Motor Speedway.

Kahne appeared in Victory Lane after celebrating in the infield to commemorate his fourth career victory in front of a crowd of 175,000 people; the win earned him $428,114. He said of his late battle for the lead, "The car was turning 10 times better than it had been the pit stop before. By then, I knew we had a car that could race. That's all I've ever wanted here, a car that could race with Jimmie. Every time you get to the end, you know Jimmie is the guy to beat. We got to that point and had a car that could race him." Johnson was not disappointed that a streak of consecutive victories at the track ended at four because of unfavorable adjustments to his car, "We had a great car tonight. We had the fastest car at times. We didn't have enough speed at the end. I hate to see the streak come to an end, but we're still very fortunate to win three of them." Third-placed Edwards stated he was happy despite his penalty for entering pit road while it was closed, "We kept freeing the car up and it got a little too free in, and we played with tyre pressures all night. We overcame some terrible adversity tonight and I was so proud of my team."

The combination of a repaved track and the harder compound Goodyear tire received a mixed response from drivers. Jeff Gordon voiced criticism towards Goodyear as he believed their hard compound tires were not suitable for the track, "Goodyear can do better than this, and we could put on a better race. The track was great, but the tires were terrible, the worst I've ever driven on. I know Goodyear can do better than this." Martin praised the combination, "I'd say for the first time with the new asphalt, it gets an A, You don't get many of those. I want to compliment Goodyear, too. It was a hard tire to drive on, but it was a good race." Kenseth was more cautious in his assessment, "Some people made it work better than others. The surface is great, the small fuel cell made it interesting on pit road. Hopefully, we won't have that small fuel cell next time and maybe a little softer tire, but the pavement is awesome." Stewart was transported to Carolinas Medical Center and an X-ray found the tip of his right scapula was fractured. He was treated and released a few hours later. Stewart later planned to start the following week's race at Dover International Speedway, and Joe Gibbs Racing hired semi-retired racer Ricky Rudd as Stewart's relief driver to allow for a faster recovery.

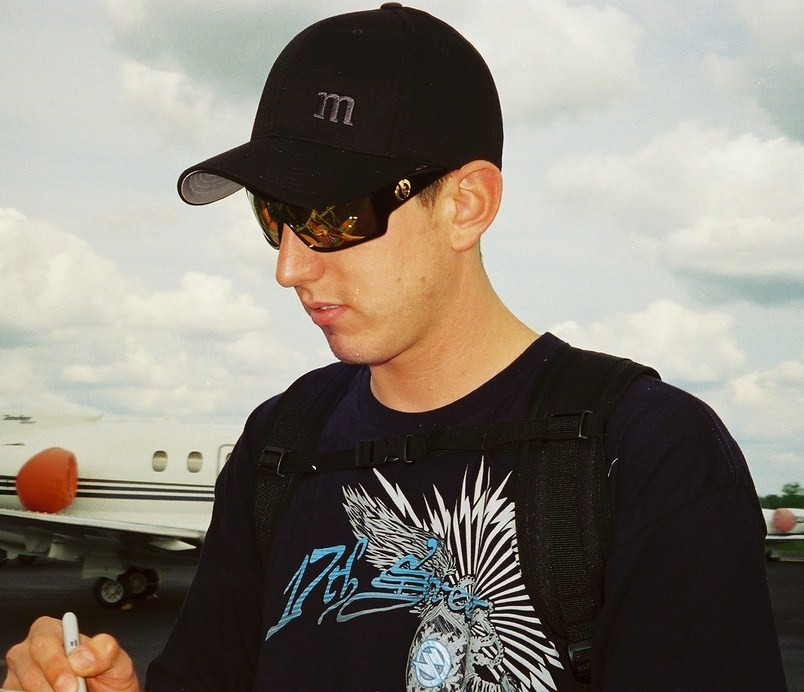
Kyle Busch (pictured in 2008) was fined $50,000 and lost 25 Drivers' Championship points for throwing his HANS device at Casey Mears' car.

Kyle Busch and his crew chief Alan Gustafson was ordered by NASCAR to meet president Mike Helton and other series officials about his collision with Mears after the race. He said he could have not done anything different, "You've got to be frustrated at somebody for taking out such a great racecar like that, It was capable of winning the race, really. We were coming along right there at the end of the run, kind of clicking them off and coming through the field. I was very happy with the handling, and then Casey just lost it." Mears said he felt Busch over-reacted and needed to mature, "What do you say about it? It's kind of the same thing over and over again with him overreacting. ... At some point he has to learn how to carry himself a little better, grow up a little bit and not act react like that." Two days after the race, NASCAR announced penalties for Hendrick Motorsports. The penalties, for "actions detrimental to stock car racing" (a violation of Section 12-4-A of the NASCAR Rule Book); entering the track without authorization and for throwing an object at another driver's car, included a $50,000 fine for Busch, who was put on probation until December 31, 2006. He and team owner Rick Hendrick were penalized 25 points in the Drivers' and Owners' Championships.

Additionally, Evernham Motorsports were found to transgress Section 12-4-A, 12-4-Q "car, car parts, components and/or equipment used that do not conform to NASCAR rules" and Section 20-12.8.1A "(roof height too low in post-race inspection" for Mayfield's No. 19 car. Crew chief Chris Andrews was fined $35,000, and Mayfield and team owner Ray Evernham had 25 Drivers' and Owners' Championship points deducted. The result kept Johnson in the lead of the Drivers' Championship with 1,861 points, ahead of Kenseth, who moved to second. Martin advanced to third while Stewart fell to fourth. Earnhardt maintained fifth. Kahne's victory moved him to sixth place. Gordon, Burton, Harvick and Kyle Busch filled positions seven to ten. In the Manufacturers' Championship, Chevrolet led with 86 points, followed by Ford in second (72 points), and Dodge in third (70 points). The race took four hours, 39 minutes, and 25 seconds to complete, and the margin of victory was 2.114 seconds.

=== Race results ===
Pos.	Grid	No.	Driver	Team	Manufacturer	Laps	Points
1	9	9	Kasey Kahne	Evernham Motorsports	Dodge	400	190^{2}
2	3	48	Jimmie Johnson	Hendrick Motorsports	Chevrolet	400	175^{1}
3	22	99	Carl Edwards	Roush Racing	Ford	400	170^{1}
4	21	6	Mark Martin	Roush Racing	Ford	400	165^{1}
5	6	17	Matt Kenseth	Roush Racing	Ford	400	160^{1}
6	11	31	Jeff Burton	Richard Childress Racing	Chevrolet	400	155^{1}
7	7	16	Greg Biffle	Roush Racing	Ford	400	151^{1}
8	33	26	Jamie McMurray	Roush Racing	Ford	400	142
9	8	11	Denny Hamlin	Joe Gibbs Racing	Chevrolet	400	143^{1}
10	23	41	Reed Sorenson	Chip Ganassi Racing	Dodge	400	134
11	34	8	Dale Earnhardt Jr.	Dale Earnhardt, Inc.	Chevrolet	400	130
12	10	66	Jeff Green	Haas CNC Racing	Chevrolet	400	132^{1}
13	1	10	Scott Riggs	Evernham Motorsports	Dodge	400	129^{1}
14	36	15	Paul Menard	Dale Earnhardt, Inc.	Chevrolet	400	121
15	2	19	Jeremy Mayfield	Evernham Motorsports	Dodge	400	93^{3}
16	41	7	Robby Gordon	Robby Gordon Motorsports	Chevrolet	400	115
17	5	43	Bobby Labonte	Petty Enterprises	Dodge	400	117^{1}
18	19	01	Joe Nemechek	MB2 Motorsports	Chevrolet	399	109
19	15	07	Clint Bowyer	Richard Childress Racing	Chevrolet	399	106
20	4	18	J. J. Yeley	Joe Gibbs Racing	Chevrolet	399	103
21	27	1	Martin Truex Jr.	Dale Earnhardt, Inc.	Chevrolet	399	100
22	31	32	Travis Kvapil	Bill Davis Racing	Chevrolet	399	102^{1}
23	30	42	Casey Mears	Chip Ganassi Racing	Dodge	398	94
24	14	70	Johnny Sauter	Haas CNC Racing	Chevrolet	398	91
25	39	45	Kyle Petty	Petty Enterprises	Dodge	397	88
26	40	21	Ken Schrader	Wood Brothers Racing	Ford	397	85
27	38	4	Scott Wimmer	Morgan-McClure Motorsports	Chevrolet	397	87^{1}
28	16	14	Sterling Marlin	MB2 Motorsports	Chevrolet	396	79
29	35	78	Kenny Wallace	Furniture Row Racing	Chevrolet	396	76
30	26	38	Elliott Sadler	Robert Yates Racing	Ford	396	78^{1}
31	25	40	David Stremme	Chip Ganassi Racing	Dodge	396	70
32	29	22	Dave Blaney	Bill Davis Racing	Dodge	395	67
33	24	44	Terry Labonte	Hendrick Motorsports	Chevrolet	393	64
34	12	29	Kevin Harvick	Richard Childress Racing	Chevrolet	373	61
35	18	12	Ryan Newman	Penske Racing South	Dodge	369	58
36	13	24	Jeff Gordon	Hendrick Motorsports	Chevrolet	360	60^{1}
37	17	25	Brian Vickers	Hendrick Motorsports	Chevrolet	331	52
38	28	5	Kyle Busch	Hendrick Motorsports	Chevrolet	313	24^{3}
39	20	2	Kurt Busch	Penske Racing South	Dodge	290	46
40	42	96	Tony Raines	Hall of Fame Racing	Chevrolet	264	43
41	43	55	Michael Waltrip	McGlynn Racing	Dodge	116	45^{1}
42	32	20	Tony Stewart	Joe Gibbs Racing	Chevrolet	32	37
43	37	88	Dale Jarrett	Robert Yates Racing	Ford	0	34
^{1} Includes five bonus points for leading a lap^{2} Includes ten bonus points for leading the most laps^{3} Includes a 25-point post-race penalty

== Standings after the race ==
Drivers' Championship standings

Pos	+/–	Driver	Points
1		Jimmie Johnson	1,861
2	1	Matt Kenseth	1,752 (−109)
3	2	Mark Martin	1,652 (−209)
4	2	Tony Stewart	1,630 (−231)
5		Dale Earnhardt Jr.	1,590 (−271)
6	2	Kasey Kahne	1,569 (−292)
7	1	Jeff Gordon	1,451 (−410)
8	2	Jeff Burton	1,450 (−411)
9		Kevin Harvick	1,426 (−435)
10	3	Kyle Busch	1,412 (−449)

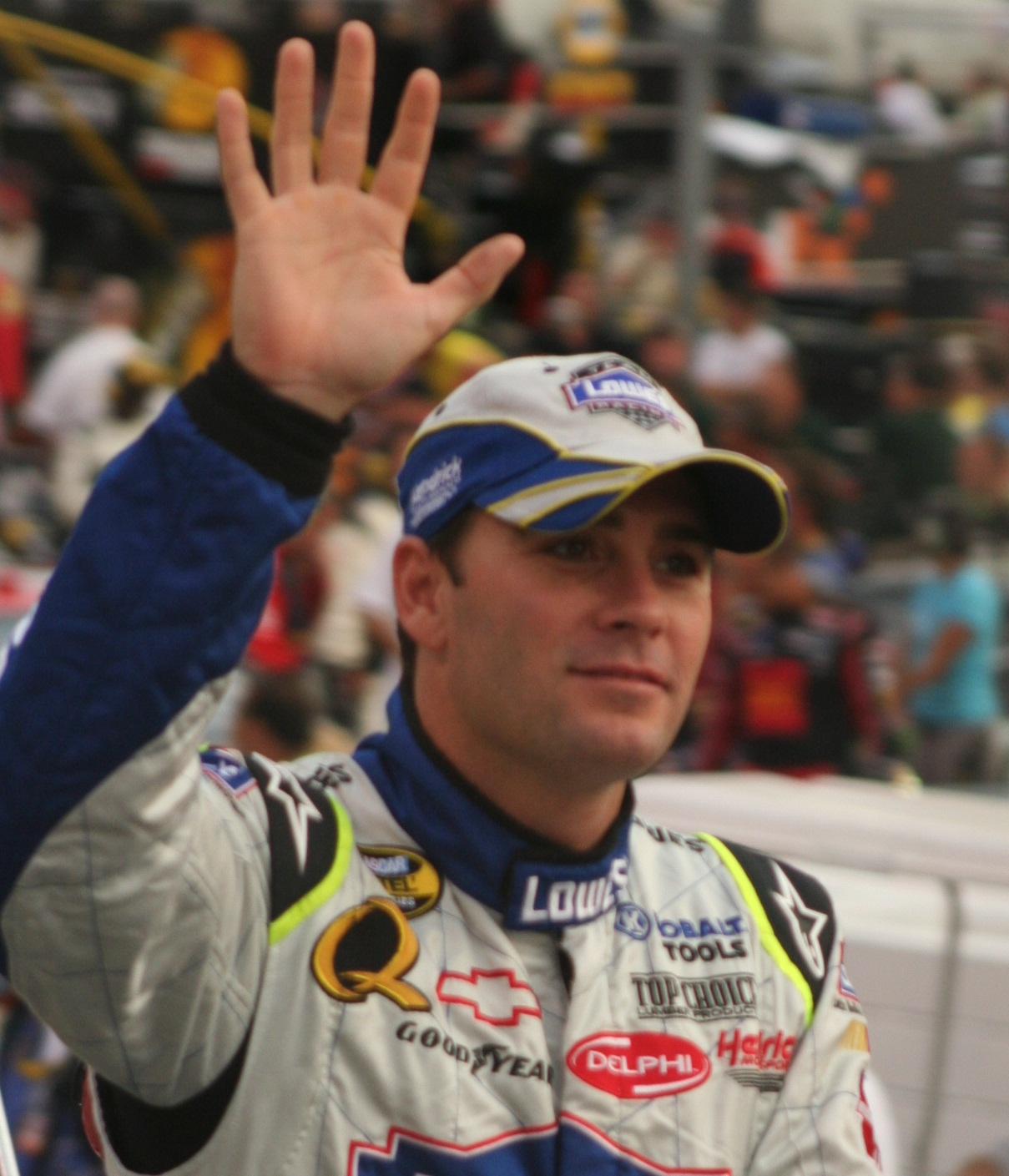
Jimmie Johnson (pictured in 2007) remained the points leader after the race.

Manufacturers' Championship standings

Pos	+/–	Manufacturer	Points
1		Chevrolet	86
2		Ford	72 (−14)
3		Dodge	70 (−16)

- Note: Only the top ten positions are included for the driver standings.

Previous race: 2006 Dodge Charger 500	Nextel Cup Series; 2006 season	Next race: 2006 Neighborhood Excellence 400
