= Twin-turbo =

Turbo layout that uses two turbochargers

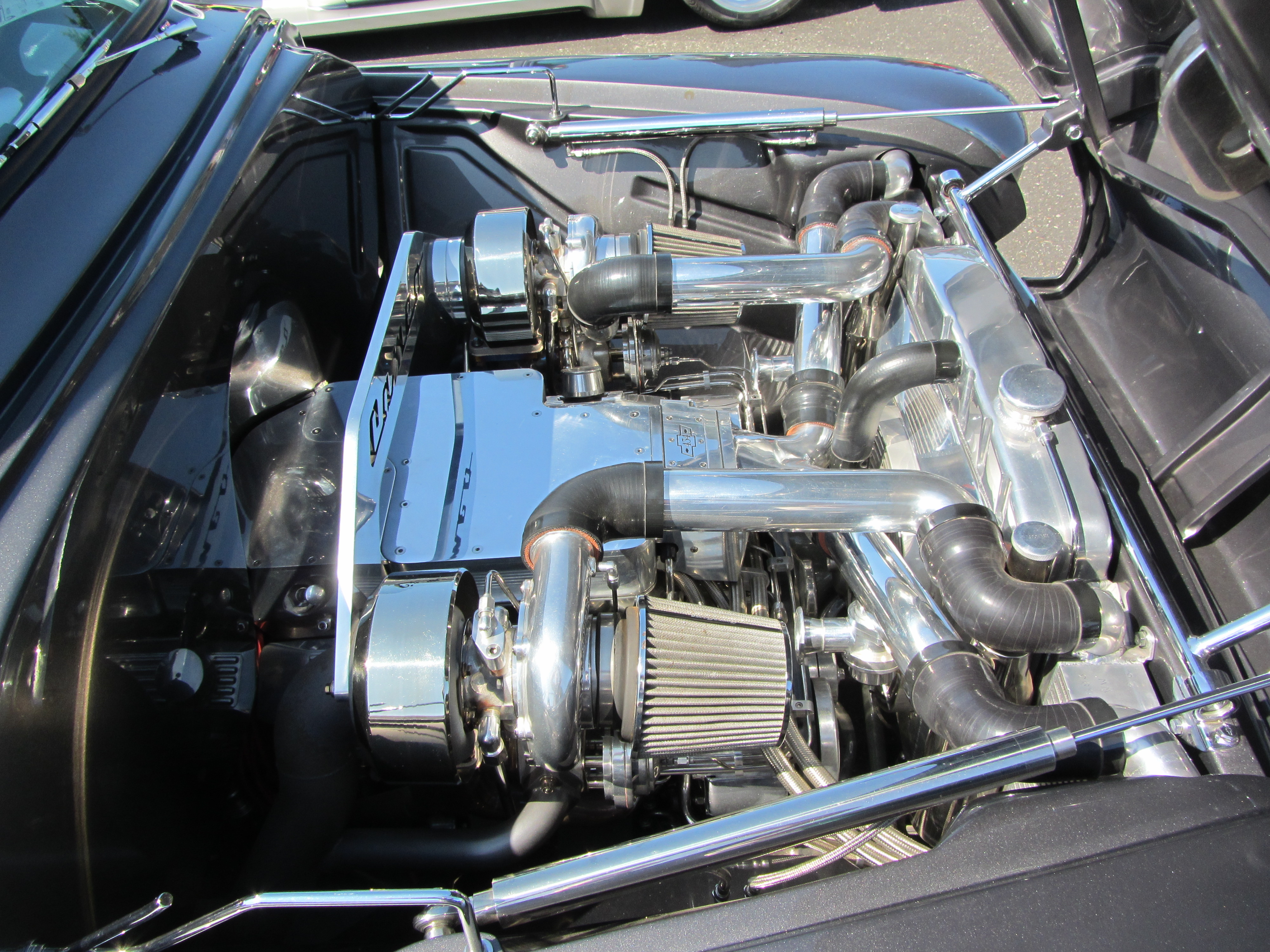
A twin-turbocharged Chevrolet 454 V8 engine in a 1957 Chevrolet pickup

Twin-turbo is a type of turbo layout in which two turbochargers are used to compress the intake air/fuel mixture (or intake air, in the case of a direct-injection engine). The most common layout features two identical or mirrored turbochargers in parallel, each processing half of a V engine's produced exhaust through independent piping. The two turbochargers can either be matching or different sizes.

== Types and combinations ==
There are three types of turbine setups used for twin-turbo setups:

- Parallel
- Sequential
- Series

These can be applied to any of the five types of compressor setups (which theoretically could have 15 different setups):

- Compound Compressors
- Staged Compound Compressors
- Staged Sequential Compressors
- Parallel Sequential Compressors
- Parallel Compressors

== Parallel ==
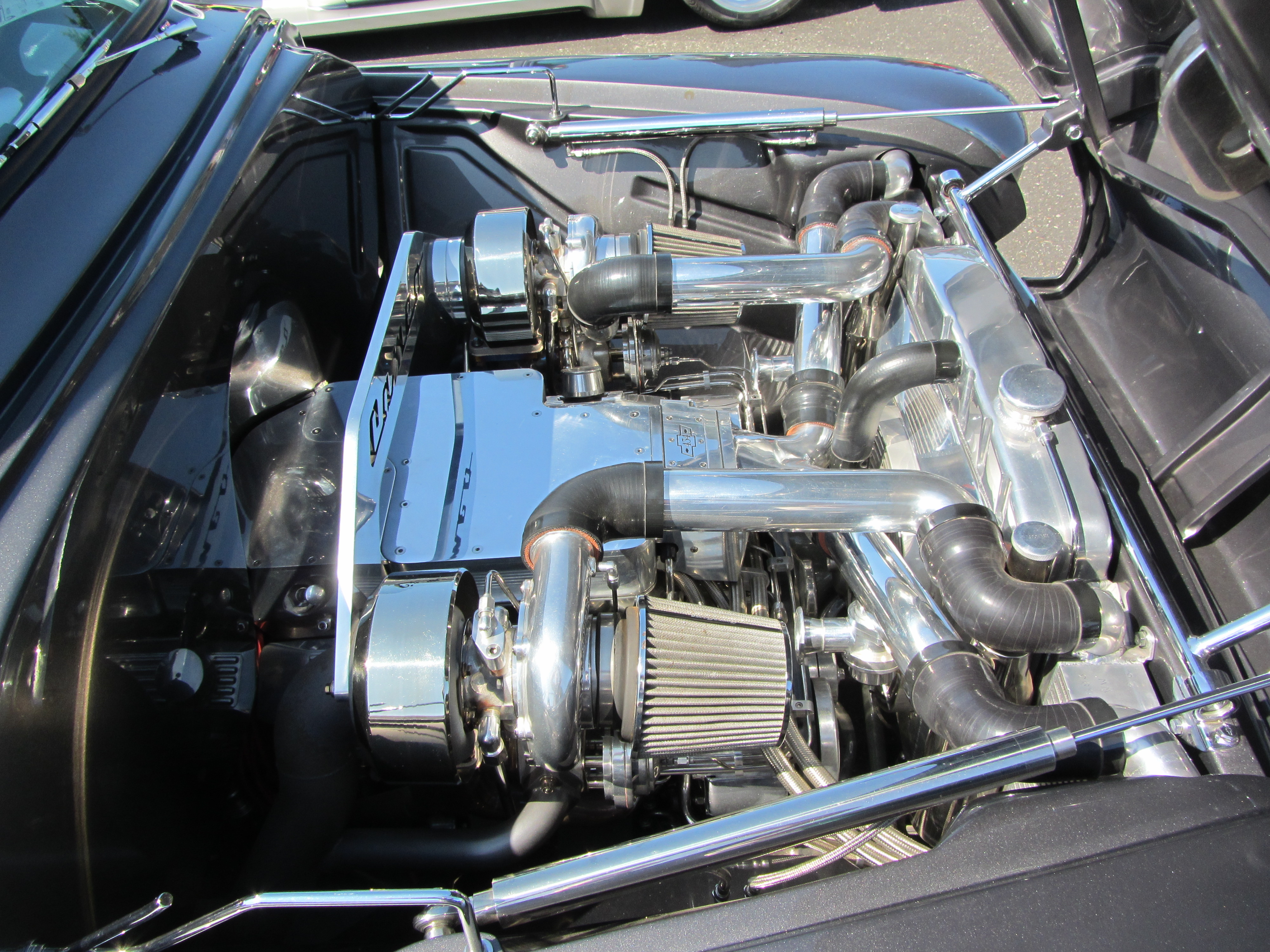
Chevrolet big-block V8 engine with parallel twin-turbos

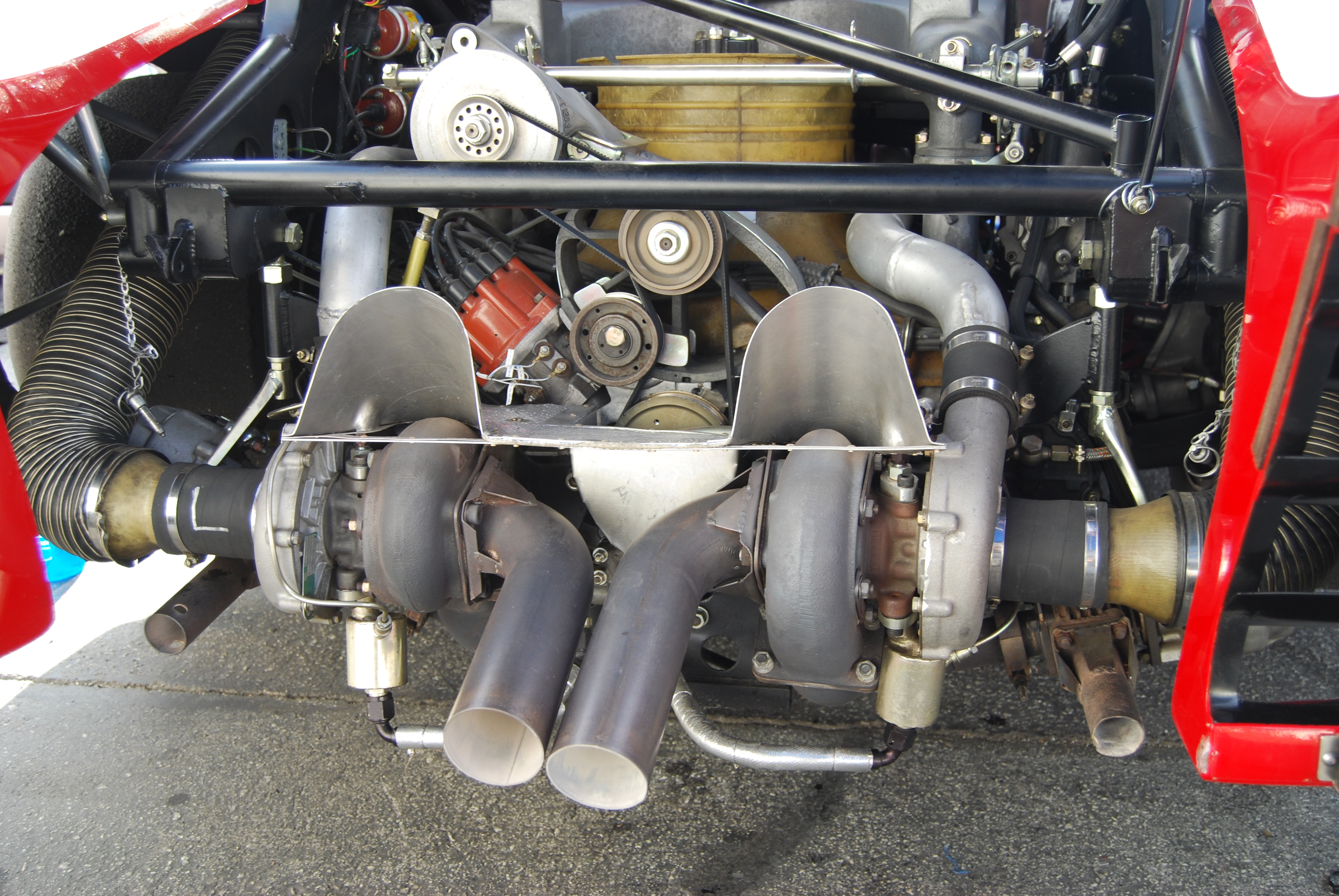
Porsche 935 flat-six engine with parallel twin-turbos

In a parallel configuration, two equally-sized turbochargers each receive half of the exhaust gases. Some designs combine the intake charge from each turbocharger into a single intake manifold, while others use a separate intake manifold for each turbocharger.

Parallel configurations are well suited to V6 and V8 engines since each turbocharger can be assigned to one cylinder bank, reducing the amount of exhaust piping needed. In this case, each turbocharger is fed exhaust gases by a separate exhaust manifold. For four-cylinder engines and straight-six engines, both turbochargers can be mounted to a single exhaust manifold.

The aim of using parallel twin-turbos is to reduce turbo lag by being able to use smaller turbochargers than if a single turbocharger was used for the engine. On engines with multiple cylinder banks (e.g. V engines and flat engines) use of parallel twin-turbos can also simplify the exhaust system.

The 1981–1994 Maserati Biturbo was the first production car to use twin-turbochargers.

== Sequential ==
Sequential turbocharging is a set-up in which the engine uses one turbocharger for lower engine speeds, and a second or both turbochargers at higher engine speeds. This system is intended to overcome the limitation of large turbochargers providing insufficient boost at low RPM, known colloquially as "turbo lag". On the other hand, smaller turbos are effective at low RPM (when there is less kinetic energy present in the exhaust gases) but are unable to provide the quantity of compressed intake gases required at higher RPM. Therefore, sequential turbocharger systems provide a way to decrease turbo lag without compromising power output at high RPM.

The system is typically arranged so that a smaller ("primary") turbocharger is active while the engine is operating at low RPM, which reduces the boost threshold (RPM at which effective boost is provided) and turbo lag. As RPM increases, a small amount of exhaust gas is fed to the larger ("secondary") turbocharger, to bring it up to operating speed. Then at high RPM, all of the exhaust gases are directed to the secondary turbocharger, so that it can provide the boost required by the engine at high RPM.

The first production car to use sequential turbocharging was the 1986–1988 Porsche 959, which used sequential twin-turbos on its flat-six engine. The sequential system in the 959's flat-6 engine is somewhat unique, in that it uses two identically sized turbochargers and clever exhaust system design. At low engine RPM, all exhaust gases from both cylinder banks are routed to the left-hand turbocharger to "spool up" and create usable boost as quickly as possible. Valving in the exhaust and charge pipe systems gradually bring the right-hand turbocharger up to speed, and at high RPM and power, the engine functionally operates as a parallel bi-turbo system.

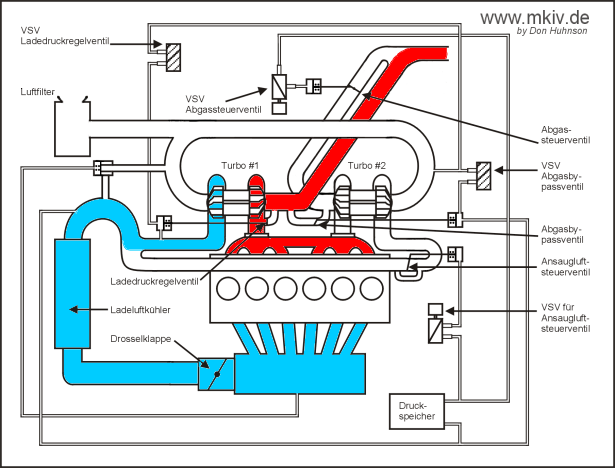
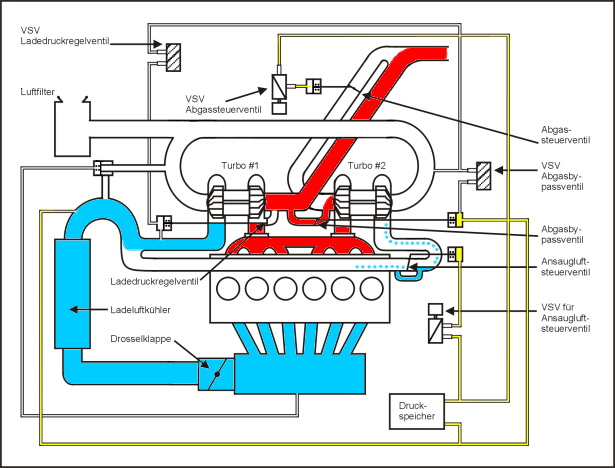
Sequential turbo operation of a Toyota 2JZ-GTE: primary turbo at low RPM (left), pre-spooling secondary turbo (centre), secondary turbo operation (right)

== Series ==
Serial turbocharging is where the turbochargers are connected in series with the output of the first turbocharger being further compressed by the second turbocharger and in some cases powering the larger turbine.

A serial turbo can also be useful in a system where the output pressure must be greater than what can be provided by a single turbo, commonly called a compound twin-turbo system. In this case, multiple similarly sized turbochargers are used in sequence, but constantly operating. The first turbo boosts provides the initial compression (for example to three times the intake pressure). Subsequent turbos take the charge from the previous stage and compress it further (for example to an additional three times intake pressure, for a total boost of nine times atmospheric pressure).

A downside of staged turbocharging is that it often leads to large amounts of turbo lag, therefore it is mostly used on piston engine aircraft which usually do not need to rapidly raise and lower engine speed, and thus where turbo lag is not a primary design consideration; and where the intake pressure is quite low due to low atmospheric pressure at altitude, requiring a very high pressure ratio. High-performance diesel engines also sometimes use this configuration, since diesel engines do not suffer from pre-ignition issues and can therefore use high boost pressures.

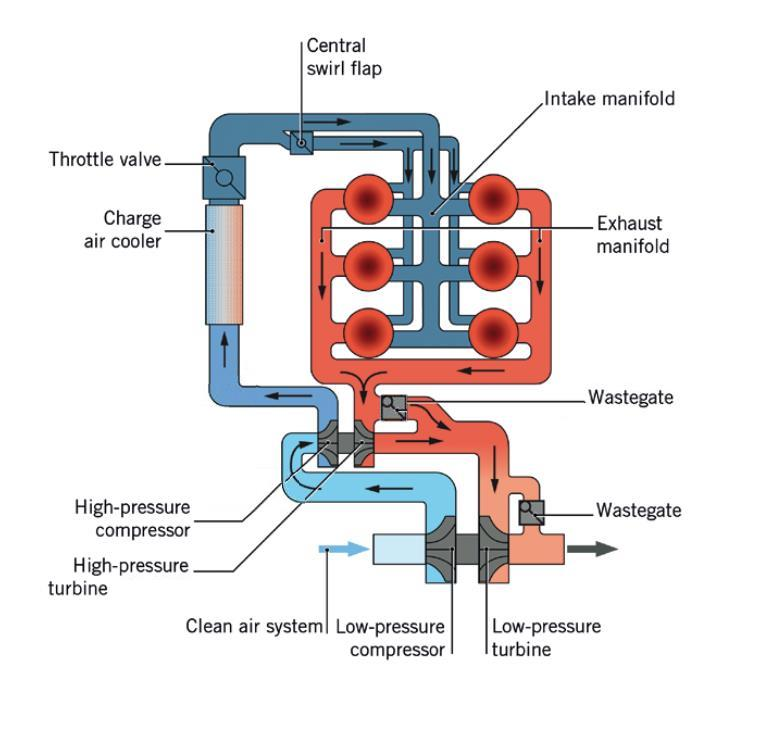
Series Compound Twin Turbo Diagram

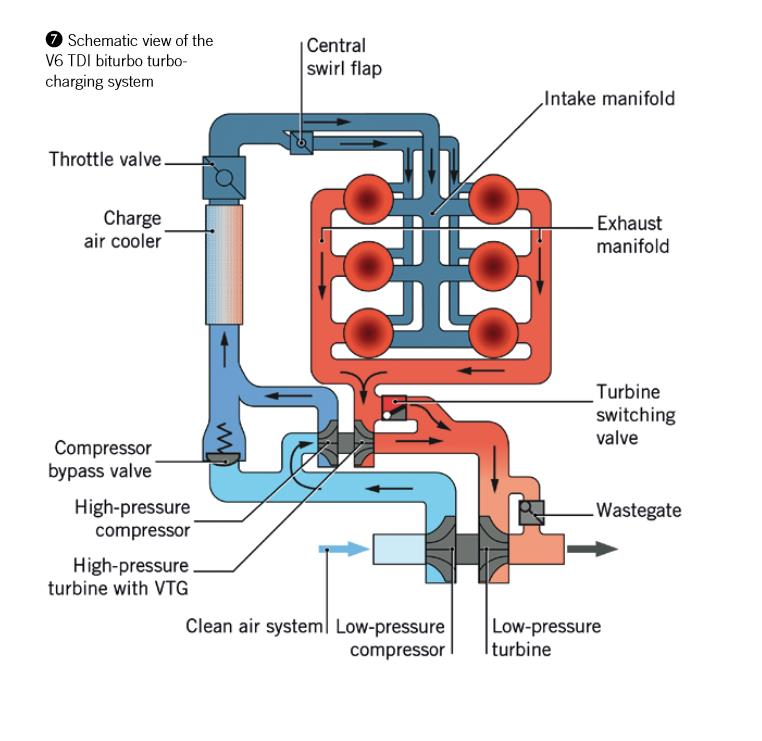
Series Staged Compound Twin Turbo Diagram

== See also ==
- Boost gauge
- Boost controller
- Intercooler
- Turbocharged diesel engines
- Turbocharged petrol engines
