= Boost gauge =

Type of pressure gauge

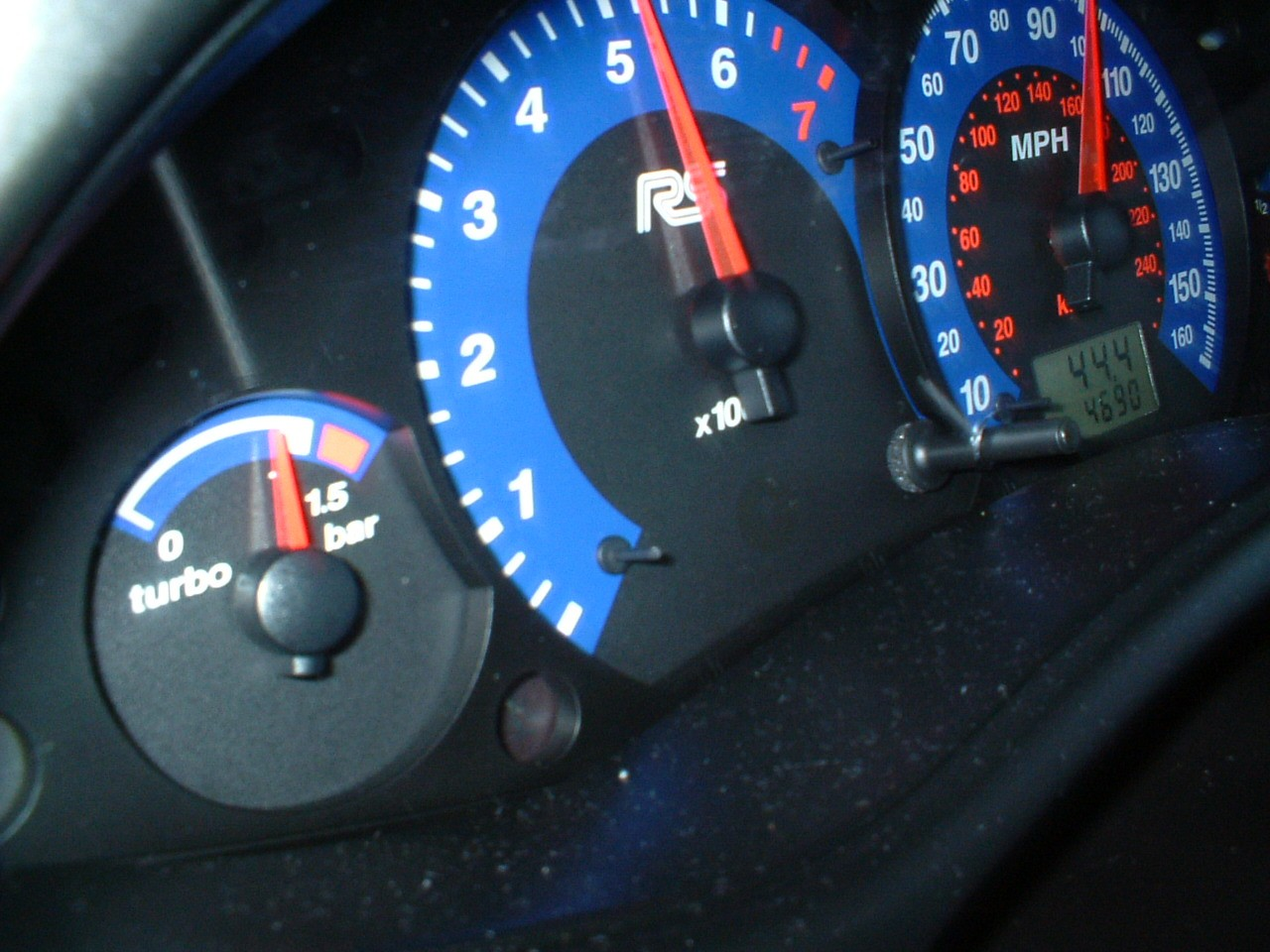
Boost gauge on a 2000's Ford Focus RS (left)

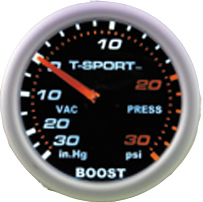
30 psi Boost gauge

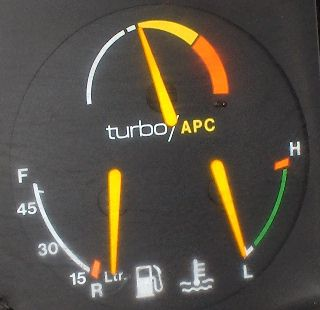
Top: Turbo/APC boost gauge in a Saab 900

A boost gauge is a pressure gauge that indicates manifold air pressure or turbocharger or supercharger boost pressure in an internal combustion engine. They are commonly mounted on the dashboard, on the driver's side pillar, or in a radio slot.

Turbochargers and superchargers are both engine-driven air compressors (exhaust-driven or mechanically driven, respectively) and provide varying levels of boost according to engine rpm, load etc. Quite often there is a power band within a given range of available boost pressure and it is an aid to performance driving to be aware of when that power band is being approached, in the same way a driver wants to be aware of engine rpm.

A boost gauge is used to ensure excessive pressure is not being generated when boost pressure is being modified to levels higher than OEM standard on a production turbocharged car. Simple methods can be employed to increase factory boost levels, such as bleeding air off the wastegate diaphragm to 'fool' it into staying closed longer, or installing a boost controller. To prevent the Air-fuel ratio from going lean (caused by increasing the boost beyond the fuel systems capacity) care must be taken to monitor boost pressure levels, along with oxygen levels in the exhaust gas, using an air-fuel ratio meter that monitors the oxygen sensor.

A boost gauge will measure pressure in psi, bar or kPa; many also measure manifold vacuum pressure in inches of mercury (in. Hg) or mm of mercury (mm Hg).

== See also ==
- Automatic Performance Control
- Pressure measurement
