= Crankcase ventilation system =

System to relieve pressure in a combustion engine's crankcase

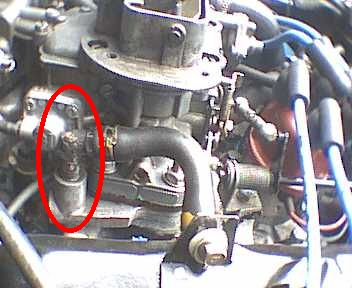
PCV valve on Ford Taunus V4 engine (feeding from left side valve cover into the inlet manifold)

A crankcase ventilation system (CVS) removes unwanted gases from the crankcase of an internal combustion engine. The system usually consists of a tube, a one-way valve and a vacuum source (such as the inlet manifold).

The unwanted gases, called blow-by, are gases from the combustion chamber which have leaked past the piston rings. Early engines released these gases to the atmosphere simply by leaking them through the crankcase seals. The first specific crankcase ventilation system was the road draught tube, which used a partial vacuum to draw the gases through a tube and release them to the atmosphere. Positive crankcase ventilation (PCV) systems – first used in the Second World War and present on most modern engines – send the crankcase gases back to the combustion chamber, as part of the vehicle emissions control, in order to reduce air pollution.

Two-stroke engines with a crankcase compression design do not need a crankcase ventilation system, because normal operation of the engine involves sending the crankcase gases to the combustion chamber.

== Source of crankcase gases ==
Blow-by, as it is often called, is the result of combustion material from the combustion chamber "blowing" past the piston rings and into the crankcase. These blow-by gases, if not ventilated, inevitably condense and combine with the oil vapor present in the crankcase, forming oil sludge. Excessive crankcase pressure can furthermore lead to engine oil leaks past the crankshaft seals and other engine seals and gaskets. Therefore, it becomes imperative that a crankcase ventilation system be used.

== Atmospheric venting ==
Until the early 20th century, blow-by gases escaped from the crankcase by leaking through seals and gaskets. It was considered normal for oil to leak from an engine and drip onto the ground, as this had also been the case for steam engines in the decades before. Gaskets and shaft seals were intended to limit the leakage of oil, but they were usually not expected to entirely prevent it. The blow-by gases would diffuse through the oil and then leak through the seals and gaskets into the atmosphere, causing air pollution and odors.

The first refinement in crankcase ventilation was the road draught tube. This is a pipe running from the crankcase (or the valve cover on an overhead-valve engine) down to a downwards-facing open end located in the vehicle's slipstream. When the vehicle is moving, airflow across the open end of the tube creates suction (a draught) that pulls gases out of the crankcase. To prevent too much vacuum being created, the blow-by gases are replaced by fresh air using a device called a breather. The breather is often located in the oil cap. Many breathers had a cup or scoop and were located in the air stream of the engine radiator fan. This type of system is the pressure–suction type; air is forced into the scoop of the breather and by vacuum is drawn out by the road draft tube. Another variation of the pressure–suction type was used on VW Porsche air-cooled engines whereby the front crankcase pulley has a reverse screw built into it which brings air into the engine and air escapes the crankcase with the road draft tube. This system works very well in getting rid of crankcase vapors which are harmful to the engine. As per the earlier engines, the road draught tube system also created pollution and objectionable odors. The draught tube could become clogged with snow or ice, in which case crankcase pressure would build and cause oil leaks and gasket failure.

On slow-moving delivery vehicles and boats, there was often no suitable air slipstream for the road draught tube. In these situations, the engines used positive pressure at the breather tube to push blow-by gases from the crankcase. Therefore, the breather air intake was often located in the airflow behind the engine's cooling fan. The crankcase gases exited to the atmosphere via a draught tube.

== Positive crankcase ventilation (PCV) ==
=== History ===
Although the modern purpose of a positive crankcase ventilation (PCV) system is to reduce air pollution, the original purpose was to allow an engine to operate underwater without the water leaking in. The first PCV systems were built during World War II, to allow tank engines to operate during deep fording operations, where the normal draught tube ventilator would have allowed water to enter the crankcase and destroy the engine.

In the early 1950s, Professor Arie Jan Haagen-Smit established that pollution from automobile engines was a major cause of the smog crisis being experienced in Los Angeles, California. The California Motor Vehicle Pollution Control Board (a precursor to the California Air Resources Board) was established in 1960 and began researching how to prevent blow-by gases from being released directly into the atmosphere. The PCV system was designed to re-circulate the gases into the air intake so that they could be combined with the fresh air/fuel and get more completely combusted. In 1961, California regulations required that all new cars be sold with a PCV system, therefore representing the first implementation of a vehicle emissions control device.

Starting with the 1963 model year, most new cars sold in the U.S. were so equipped by voluntary industry action so as to avoid having to make multiple state-specific versions of vehicles. PCV quickly became standard equipment on all vehicles worldwide because of its benefits not only in emissions reduction but also in engine internal cleanliness and oil lifespan.

In 1967, several years after its introduction into production, the PCV system became the subject of a U.S. federal grand jury investigation, when it was alleged by some industry critics that the Automobile Manufacturers Association (AMA) was conspiring to keep several such smog reduction devices on the shelf to delay additional smog control. After eighteen months of investigation, the grand jury returned a "no-bill" decision, clearing the AMA, but resulting in a consent decree that all U.S. automobile companies agreed not to work jointly on smog control activities for a period of ten years.

In the decades since, legislation and regulation of vehicular emissions has tightened substantially. Most of today's gasoline engines continue to use PCV systems.

=== Breather ===
In order for the PCV system to draw fumes out of the crankcase, the system must have a source of fresh air. The source of this fresh air is the "crankcase breather", which is usually ducted from the engine's air filter or intake manifold. The breather is usually provided with baffles and filters to prevent oil mist and vapour from fouling the air filter. This phenomenon can be further reduced by installing after-market air oil separators or catch cans, as colloquially known, to pull oil mist out of suspension and collect it in a reservoir before it can reach the intake. A properly designed crankcase breather will also be designed in a manner that promotes the scavenging effect, or the creation of suction within the crankcase breather to further aid in the removal of blow-by gases. It is this effect that keeps the crankcase at slightly negative pressure when a properly functioning PCV system is in place.

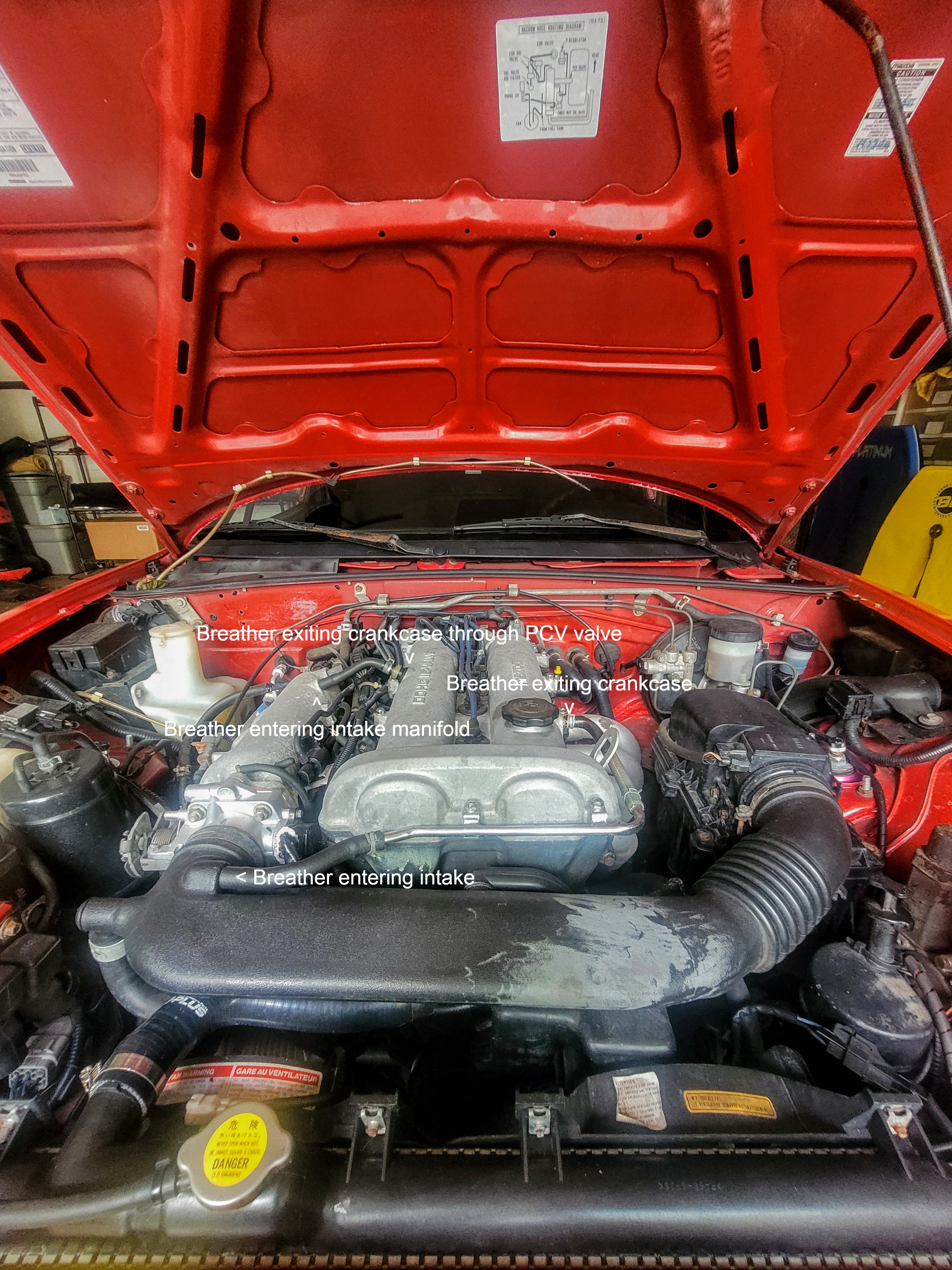
PCV system of a 1995 Mazda MX5 Miata

=== PCV valve ===
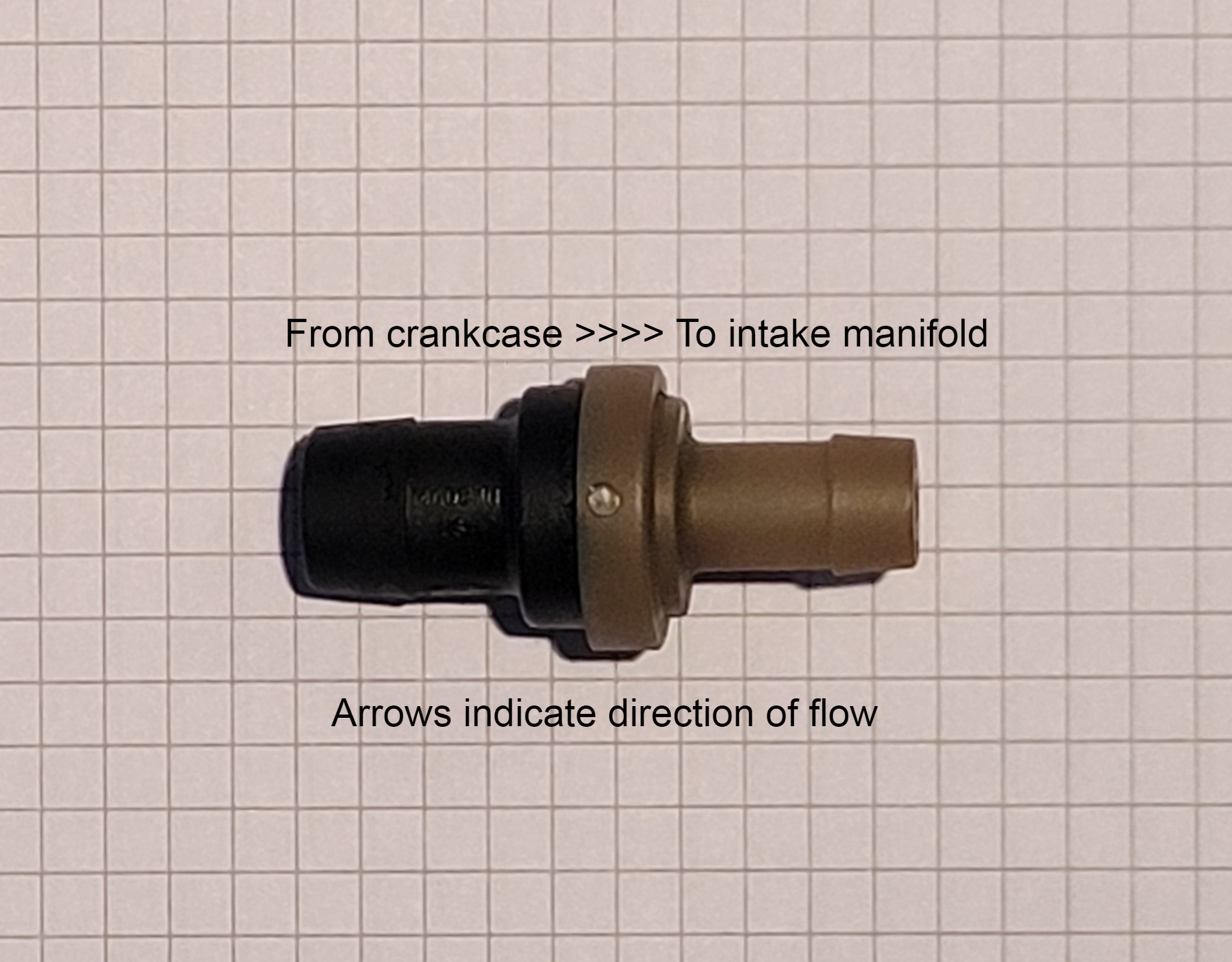
A PCV valve from a 1995 Mazda MX5 Miata

Intake manifold vacuum is applied to the crankcase via the PCV valve. The airflow through the crankcase and engine interior sweeps away combustion byproduct gases. This mixture of air and crankcase gases then exits, often via another simple baffle, screen, or mesh to exclude oil mist, through the PCV valve and into the intake manifold. On some PCV systems, this oil baffling takes place in a discrete replaceable part called the 'oil separator'. Aftermarket products sold to add an external oil baffling system to vehicles, which were not originally installed with them, are commonly known as "oil catch tanks".

The PCV valve controls the flow of crankcase gases entering the intake system. At idle, with almost closed throttle, the manifold vacuum is high, which would draw in a large quantity of crankcase gases, causing the engine to run too lean. The PCV valve closes when the manifold vacuum is high, restricting the quantity of crankcase gases entering the intake system.

When the engine is under load or operating at higher RPM, a higher quantity of blow-by gases are produced. The intake manifold vacuum, with wide open throttle, is lower in these conditions, which causes the PCV valve to open and the crankcase gases flow to the intake system. The greater flow rate of intake air during these conditions means that a greater quantity of blow-by gases can be added to the intake system without compromising the operation of the engine. The opening of the PCV valve during these conditions also compensates for the intake system being less effective at drawing crankcase gases into the intake system.

A second function of the PCV valve is to act as a flame arrester and check valve to prevent positive pressure from the intake system from entering the crankcase. This can happen on turbocharged engines or when a backfire takes place, and the positive pressure could damage the crankcase seals and gaskets, or even cause a crankcase explosion. The PCV valve therefore closes when positive pressure is present, to prevent it from reaching the crankcase.

The crankcase air outlet, where the PCV valve is located, is generally placed as far as possible from the crankcase breather. For example, the breather and outlet are frequently on opposite valve covers on a V engine, or on opposite ends of the valve cover on an inline engine. The PCV valve is often, but not always, placed at the valve cover; it may be located anywhere between the crankcase air outlet and the inlet manifold.

=== Forced induction applications ===
The PCV valve gains an even more important function in increasingly popular forced induction applications. Excessive crankcase pressure will not only occur due to blow-by gases escaping past the piston rings but can also be introduced when positive pressure from the intake manifold makes its way into the crankcase. As previously mentioned, in vehicles with forced induction systems such as turbochargers or superchargers, the engine's intake manifold experiences positive pressure under load. This differs from naturally aspirated applications where the intake manifold will remain in vacuum while under load. Thus, when a forced induction engine is under load, the intake manifold can no longer be used to draw blow-by gasses out of the crankcase and will instead begin to exacerbate the problem by increasing crankcase pressure. It is then the job of the PCV valve to isolate the intake manifold and crankcase when the intake manifold is pressurized and allow the flow of blow-by gases out of the crankcase when the intake manifold is under vacuum. In addition to this added role, in boosted applications cylinder pressures are much higher, and consequently, more blow-by gases are pushed into the crankcase thus making a fully functional PCV system all the more important.

=== Carbon build-up in intake systems ===
Carbon build-up in the intake manifold will occur when blow-by gases are allowed to permanently contaminate the intake air because of a failing PCV system.

Carbon build-up or oil sludge from blow-by gases on intake valves are usually not a problem in port injected engines. This is due to the fact that the fuel hits the intake valves on the way to the combustion chamber, allowing the detergents in the fuel to keep them clean. However, carbon build-up on intake valves is a problem for engines with direct injection only, as the fuel is injected directly into the combustion chamber. Because of this, fuel system cleaners or fuel additives added to the tank will not help clean these deposits. Methods for cleaning these deposits include spraying cleaner through the intake or direct media blasting of the intake valves.

== Alternatives ==
Two-stroke engines which use crankcase compression do not require a crankcase ventilation system, since all of the gases within the crankcase are then fed into the combustion chamber.

Many small four-stroke engines such as lawn mower engines and electricity generators simply use a draught tube connected to the intake system. The draught tube routes all blow-by gases back into the intake mixture and is usually located between the air filter and carburetor.

Dry sump engines in some drag racing cars use scavenging pumps to extract oil and gases from the crankcase. A separator removes the oil, then the gases are fed into the exhaust system via a venturi tube.. This system maintains a small amount of vacuum in the crankcase and minimises the amount of oil in the engine that could potentially spill onto the racetrack.
