= Clockspring =

Car component

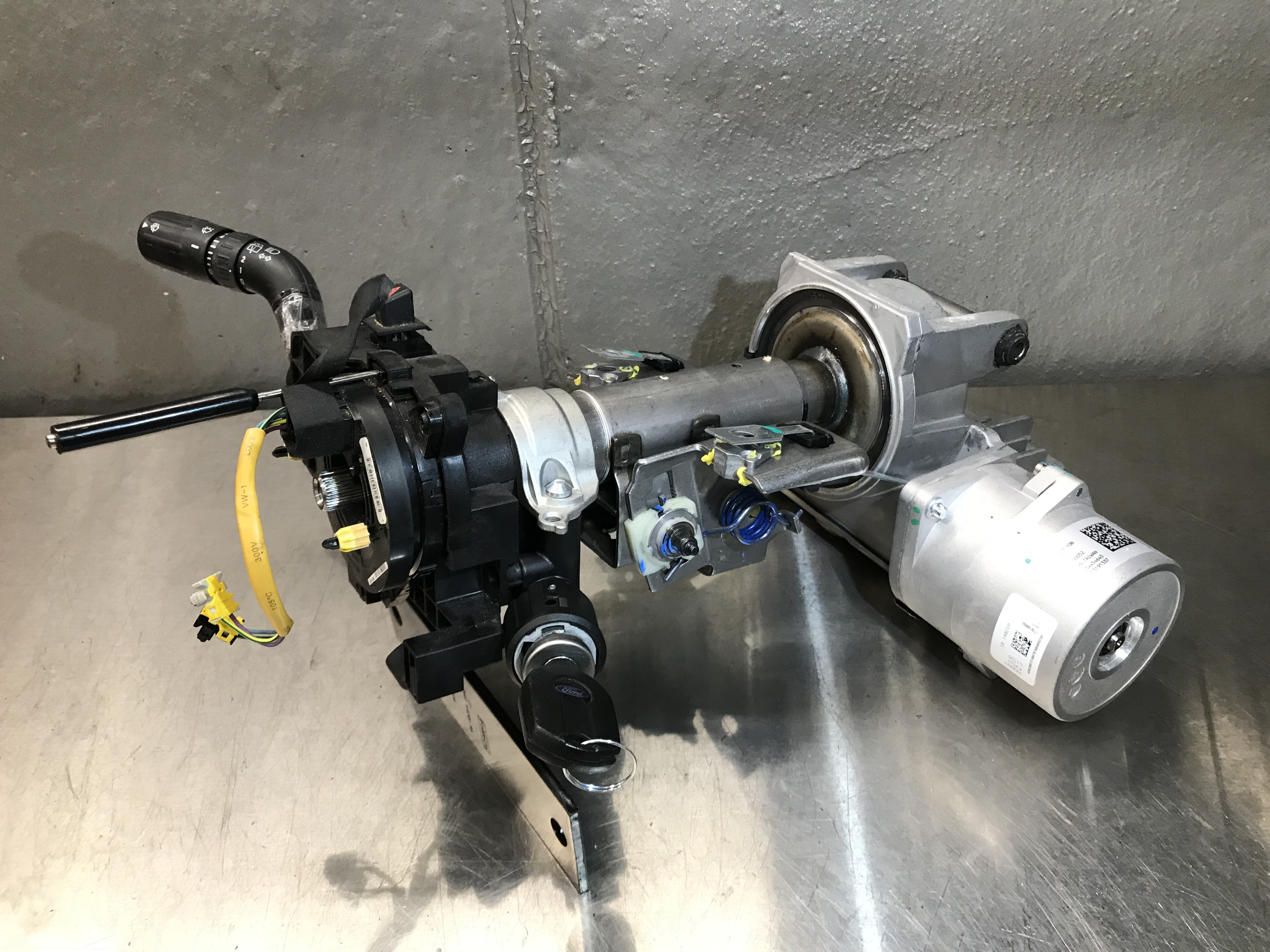
A steering column; The clockspring is the small black drum with yellow wires at the front end.

A clockspring (also referred to as a "spiral spring" or "spiral cable") is a type of spring often found in automobiles, that stores energy on a rotating axis. Clocksprings generally consist of a flat multicore cable wound in a spiral shape similar to a clock spring, hence the name, but the name is also given to devices fulfilling the same purpose but which use spring-loaded brushes contacting concentric slip rings.

== In automotive systems ==
In vehicle steering systems, a clockspring is a spiral-wound special rotary electrical conductor which allows a vehicle's steering wheel to turn while maintaining the connection between the airbag mounted in the wheel and/or the vehicle's horn and other devices, and the vehicle's electrical system. The clockspring is located between the steering wheel and the steering column.
