= Electrorheological clutch =

Automotive transmission component

An electrorheological clutch (ER clutch) comprises drive and driven members, generally parallel to each other, that can be selectively engaged by the application of a voltage to an electrorheological (ER) fluid. The ER fluid is used as the coupling between the input and the output (drive and driven members). The clutch acts as a power amplifier and the effect is fast (of the order of milliseconds) and reversible.

== See also ==
- Electromagnetic clutch
