= Oil catch tank =

Device to reduce oil vapors in car engines

An oil catch tank or oil catch can (OCC) is a device that is fitted into the cam/crankcase ventilation system of an internal combustion engine, typically in a car. Installing an oil catch can aims to reduce the amount of oil vapors re-circulated into the intake of the engine.

== Positive crankcase ventilation ==
During normal operation of a car engine, some vapors from the cylinder pass by the piston rings and down into the crankcase. Without ventilation this can pressurize the crankcase and cause issues such as lack of piston ring sealing and damaged oil seals.

To avoid this, manufacturers created a crankcase ventilation system. Originally this was often a very basic setup where a filter was placed on the top of the cam case and the pressure and vapors were vented to atmosphere. This was deemed unacceptable as it allowed fumes and oil mist to be vented out into the atmosphere which caused pollution. It could also cause issues for the occupants of the car as it could be drawn into the inside of the car, which was often unpleasant.

Around 1961 a new design was created. This design routed the crankcase breather into the intake of the car. This meant that the vapors and oil mist could be burnt and expelled out of the car through the exhaust. Not only was this more pleasant for the car occupants it also meant that oil mist was not released into the air or onto the road in the case of draft tube ventilation systems.

== Problems caused by intake routed crankcase breathers ==
There are two issues that can be caused by routing the crankcase breather into the intake system of an engine.

The main issue is with the buildup of oil inside the intake piping and manifold. During the normal operation of an engine the excess blow-by and oil vapors from the crankcase are allowed to enter the intake system. The oil mist cools and coats the inside of the intake piping and manifold. Over time this layer can build up and thick sludge can accumulate.

This has been made worse with the introduction of the exhaust gas recirculation (EGR) system on more modern cars. The oil vapors can mix with the re-circulated exhaust gasses and soot which then builds up on the intake manifold and valves etc. This layer over time hardens and thickens repeatedly. It will then begin to clog up the throttle body, swirl flaps, or even the intake valves on direct injected engines.

Having a buildup of sludge can cause lower performance due to the limiting effect it has on the air flow to the engine. If the buildup becomes excessive on the throttle body it can cause poor idling as it can block the air flow whilst the throttle plate is shut.

Fitting a catch can will reduce the amount of oil vapor reaching the intake tract and combustion chamber. Without the oil vapor the soot from the EGR valve will not congeal so much on the intake which will keep the intake from becoming clogged.

== Possibility of knock caused by excessive oil vapor ==
Another issue that has been raised as a possible problem with allowing oil vapor into the intake is the chance of pre-detonation (knock) caused by the oil vapor exploding during the compression cycle of the engine. This has become more of an issue as more and more cars have started to run high boost levels and high compression ratios. The higher the compression and boost the more likely the oil is to start to burn (pre-detonate). Fitting an oil catch can in the breather pipe will stop the oil vapors from reaching the combustion chamber. This will reduce the knock effect.

== How a catch can works ==
An oil catch can is fitted in line of the crank case breather system. It is placed in between the breather outlet and the intake system. As the crank vapors pass through the catch can the oil droplets, un-burnt fuel, and water vapor condense and settle in the tank. This stops them from reaching the intake and causing the issues mentioned above.

The best type of catch can will often have some sort of media inside such as a fine metal mesh or Brillo pad style metal which will create a much larger surface area for the vapors to condense.

Over time the catch can will fill up with the excess oil and will need to be drained. This is often done by opening a drain plug on the bottom of the tank.
