= Oil sludge =

Contamination inside an internal combustion engine

Oil sludge under the valve cover of an internal combustion engine

Oil sludge or black sludge is a gel-like or semi-solid deposit inside an internal combustion engine, that can create a catastrophic buildup. It is an emulsion of engine oil soluble combustion productions, water and solids. Particles accumulating in the sludge, can cause excessive engine wear. The sludge can also block the oil pump inlet screen or oil channels, causing oil starvation.

One type of sludge is called 'hot sludge' and is formed when engine oil oxidizes at high temperatures. Cold sludge is formed when engines don't get up to operating temperature, for example when the vehicle is primarily driven short distances.

== Causes ==
Oil sludge may occur due to a variety of different factors. Some of the most common causes are:

- Defective crankcase ventilation system
- Oil/coolant contamination
- Neglecting oil changes
- Low oil level
- Poor engine design
- Quality of the fuel

Prior to the phase out of leaded fuel, oil sludge consisted of up to 50% lead by weight.

== Precautions ==
Oil sludge is generally preventable through frequent oil changes at manufacturer specified intervals, however, while uncommon, some engines do have a tendency to build up more sludge than others.

Engine oils typically contain dispersant additives to inhibit sludge formation.

In response to oil sludge problems, car manufacturer started adding oil life monitors to vehicles to warn drivers to change the engine oil on time.

== Examples ==
Sludge formation was first found in combustion engines in the 1960s. During the 1980s sludge formation became a common issue again.

In 2004, Volkswagen informed 426,000 Passat and Audi A4 owners in the US warning them of sludge problems with its 1.8-liter turbocharged engines.

In 2007, Toyota settled a lawsuit with 7.5 million vehicle owners on sludge formation, although the company insisted the issue primarily occurred for vehicles which weren't serviced frequently enough.
