= Boost controller =

Regulatory device in combustion engines

In turbocharged internal combustion engines, a boost controller is a device sometimes used to increase the boost pressure produced by the turbocharger. It achieves this by reducing the boost pressure seen by the wastegate.

== Operation ==
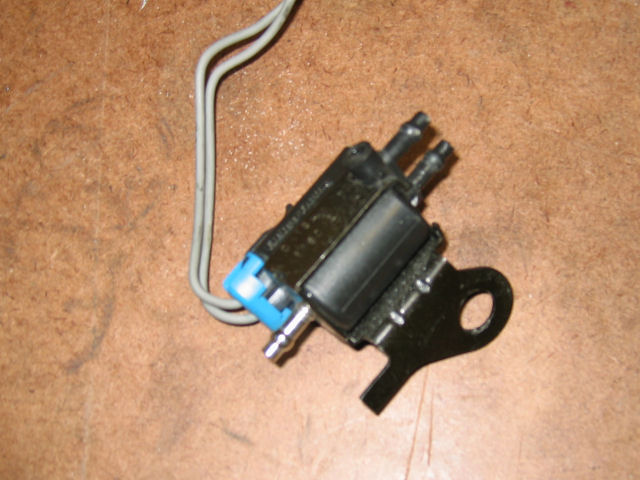
A 3-port solenoid-type boost controller

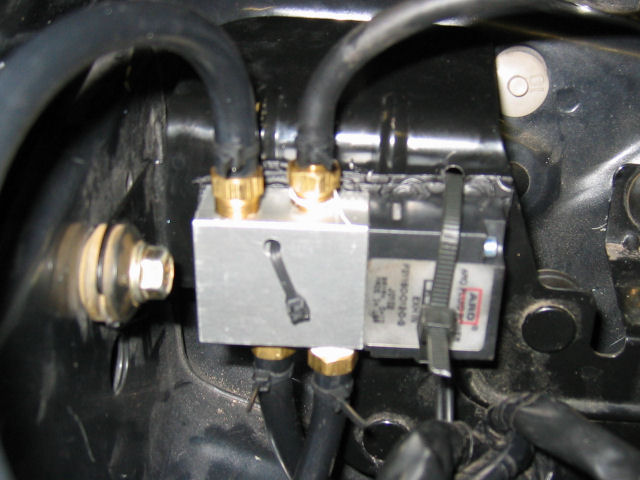
A 4-port solenoid-type boost controller (used for a dual-port wastegate)

The purpose of a boost controller is to reduce the boost pressure seen by the wastegate's reference port, in order to trick the wastegate into allowing higher boost pressures than it was designed for.

Many boost controllers use a needle valve that is opened and closed by an electric solenoid. By varying the pulse width to the solenoid, the solenoid valve can be commanded to be open a certain percentage of the time. This effectively alters the flow rate of air pressure through the valve, changing the amount of air that is bled out instead of going to the wastegate's reference port. Solenoids may require small diameter restrictors be installed in the air control lines to limit airflow and even out the on/off nature of their operation. Two-port solenoid bleed systems with a PID controller tend to be common on factory turbocharged cars.

An alternative design is to use a stepper motor. These designs allow fine control of airflow based on position and speed of the motor, but may have low total airflow capability. Some systems use a solenoid in conjunction with a stepper motor, with the stepper motor allowing fine control and the solenoid coarse control.

=== Control system ===
Most modern designs are electronic boost controllers that use an electronic control unit to control the boost via a solenoid or stepper motor. The operating principle is the same as older manual boost controllers, which is to control the air pressure presented to the wastegate actuator. Electronic controllers add greater flexibility in management of boost pressures, compared with the manual controllers.

The actuation of an electronic boost controller can be managed by one of two control systems:

- Open-loop is the simpler option, where control output is merely based on other inputs such as throttle angle and/or engine speed (RPM). Since an open-loop system does not include any monitoring of boost pressure, the boost pressure may vary based on outside variables (such as weather conditions or engine coolant temperature). For this reason, open-loop systems are less common.
- Closed-loop systems rely on feedback from a manifold pressure sensor to maintain a target boost pressure as closely as possible. These systems are more sophisticated and can more accurately control boost pressure under varying circumstances.

=== Advantages ===
By keeping the wastegate in a closed position more often, a boost controller causes more of the exhaust gas to be routed through the turbocharger, thus reducing turbo lag and lowering the boost threshold.

=== Disadvantages ===
Regardless of the effectiveness of the boost controller, wastegate actuator springs that are too soft can cause the wastegate to open before desired. This due to the exhaust gas backpressure pushing against the wastegate valve itself, causing the valve to open of the actuator at all. Therefore, there is an upper limit to the effectiveness of a boost controller for a given spring stiffness in the wastegate actuator.

To prevent excessive boost pressures in the event of a failure, the boost controller needs to be designed such that failure mode do not result in any pressure being bled off. For instance, a solenoid-type boost controller should direct all air to the wastegate when it is in the non-energized position (the common failure mode for a solenoid). Otherwise, the boost controller could get stuck in a position that lets no boost pressure reach the wastegate, causing boost to quickly rise out of control.

Also, the electronic systems, extra hoses, solenoids and control systems add cost and complexity. Nonetheless, in recent times most automobile manufacturers use boost controllers on their turbocharged engines.

== Alternatives ==
In the past, boost pressures have been controlled by restricting or bleeding off some intake air before it reaches the intake manifold. Designs which restrict the intake air can use a butterfly valve in the intake to restrict airflow as desired boost is approached. Designs which bleed off the intake air functioned similar to a blowoff valve, but on a constant basis to maintain the desired boost pressure. These methods are rarely used in modern system due to the large sacrifices in efficiency, heat, and reliability.

Variable geometry turbocharger can be used to manage boost levels, negating the need for an external boost controller. Also, the wastegate itself has a similar function to a boost controller, in that it is used to manage the turbocharger's boost pressure.
