= Sprag clutch =

One-way mechanical transmission device

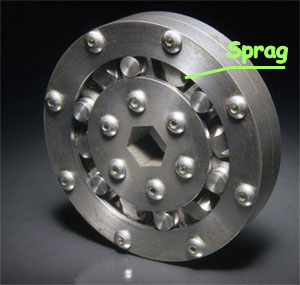
One-way bearing combining sprags and bearing rollers in one race

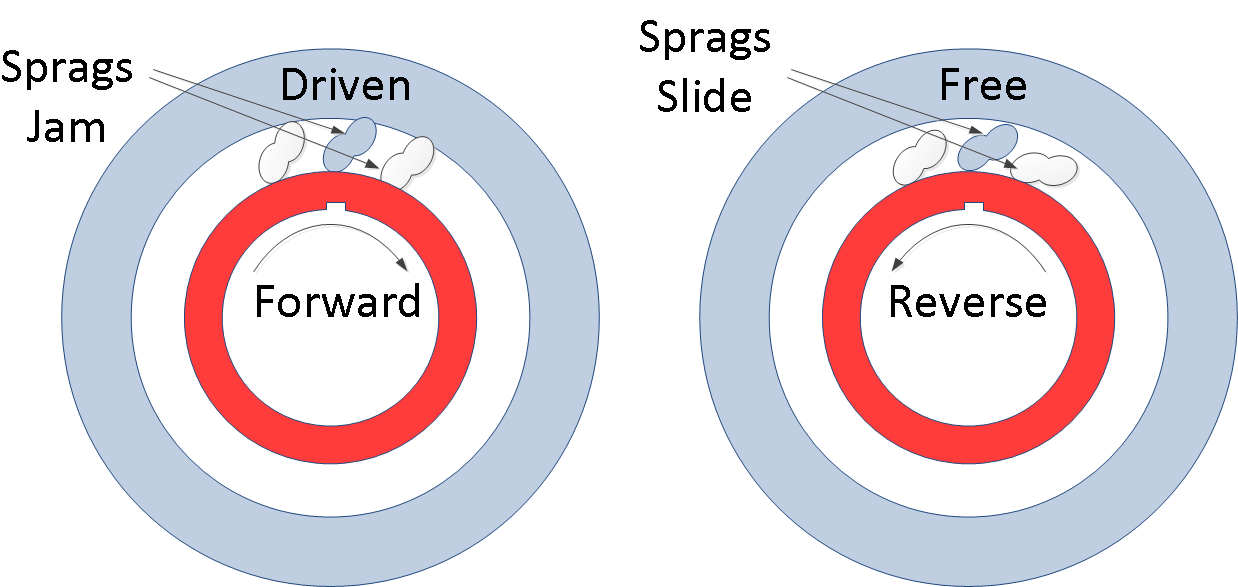
Sprags jam when driven and slide when in reverse

A sprag clutch is a one-way freewheel clutch. It resembles a roller bearing but, instead of cylindrical rollers, non-revolving asymmetric figure-eight shaped sprags, or other elements allowing single direction rotation, are used. When the unit rotates in one direction the rollers slip or free-wheel, but when a torque is applied in the opposite direction, the sprags tilt slightly, producing a wedging action and binding because of friction.

== Applications ==
=== Automatic transmissions ===
A sprag clutch is used in some automatic transmissions as a method of allowing the transmission to change gears smoothly under load. Various models of General Motors' Turbo-Hydramatic transmission have used this system as well as many transmissions from Ford, such as the Ford C6 transmission.

A sprag clutch is used in most older automatic transmissions and some newer ones for shifts which require the synchronized engagement of one clutch with the disengagement of another. Using an overrunning clutch instead of a hydraulically actuated one makes this synchronization automatic. The sprag clutch simply "lets go" once the reaction force it provides is no longer needed.

In a Simpson planetary gearset, common to many automatic transmissions, this happens on the 1-2 shift, and reverses on the 2-1 downshift. The 2-3 shift is done by engaging a single clutch, and nothing is released. Some newer electronically controlled transmissions make "clutch to clutch" shifts, without any sprags.

This can also be used exclusively in first gear (transmission shift lever in D, but auto valve body or management selecting 1st) on some autos. That way it will automatically provide forward drive, but will not provide any engine braking. This is done not so much to avoid engine braking per se, but rather to allow a low throttle opening 2-1 downshift as a car decelerates, to avoid a loud (and potentially abrupt) and unnerving jolt as a result of the downshift. On transmissions so equipped, manual selection of 1st gear typically engages an additional band that grips the same section as the one way clutch would engage, and thus allows for engine braking.

=== Turbine Starter ===
A sprag clutch may be used in the starting turbine of a turbojet engine, so that the running main engine does not keep the starter engaged at high speeds.

=== Helicopters ===
A sprag clutch is used in many helicopter designs to transfer power from the engine to the main rotor. In the event of an engine failure, the sprag clutch allows the main rotor to continue rotating faster than the engine so that the helicopter can enter autorotation.

=== Motorcycle applications ===
==== Starters ====
A sprag clutch is used in the electric starter motors of modern motorcycle engines to replace the Bendix gear common to automobile starters.

==== Primary drive ====
Many modern sport and racing motorcycles use sprag clutches in the primary drive between the engine and transmission. This prevents the rear wheel from losing traction during rapid downshifts when the engine speed is not matched to road speed. If a sprag clutch is not present, much greater care is required when downshifting, because losing rear wheel traction can cause dangerous highside accidents.

=== Bicycle hubs ===
A few brands of bicycle components have started making bicycle hub that use a sprag clutch instead of the classic multi-pawl or Ratchet design.

=== Conveyors ===
On conveyor drives, a sprag clutch is used for indexing and anti-runback.

==== Overrunning ====
Overrunning occurs when two or more motors can be used to drive the same machine, including through the same shaft. A typical setup is as follows. The service drive, or prime mover, provides a combination of high speed and high power for normal operation. The secondary drive, or pony drive, can be run at low speed and low power, usually to position the conveyor for maintenance.

The overrunning clutch allows the secondary drive to remain stationary during normal high speed operation of the conveyor drive.

==== Indexing ====
An indexing motion provides for accuracy in the drive system. A link is installed between the prime mover and one race of the sprag clutch. The reciprocating motion of the prime mover is converted to an indexing movement on the other race of the sprag clutch.

==== Backstopping ====
Backstopping prevents a loaded inclined conveyor from running back when the drive system is stopped. The outer race of the sprag clutch is fixed to the machine frame, usually via a torque arm. The inner race rotates freely in the forward direction of the conveyor drive. When the machine tries to run backward, the sprag clutch prevents this motion. In this application the sprag clutch is often called a "backstop" or "holdback".

==== Hoist load brake ====
A hoist load brake is used as a secondary brake to prevent industrial hoists from catastrophically dropping their loads in the event of mechanical failure.

=== Pumping systems ===
A sprag clutch is used in some pumping systems where a standby prime mover is required in case of a failure by the main drive. An example is a pump with a single rotating shaft through the unit connected at one end by an electric motor and the other by a standby diesel engine isolated by a sprag clutch.

=== Ratchets and Wrenches ===
Newer designed ratchets and wrenches using this design to work in the tightest spaces with no teeth and pawl required like traditional ratchets and wrenches.

== Lubrication ==
Sprag clutches may be oil or grease lubricated. Most sprag clutch manufacturers don't allow the use of lubricants containing extreme pressure additives.

== See also ==
- Ratchet (device)
- Slipper clutch
