= Cold start (automotive) =

Starting of a vehicle engine at a low ambient temperature

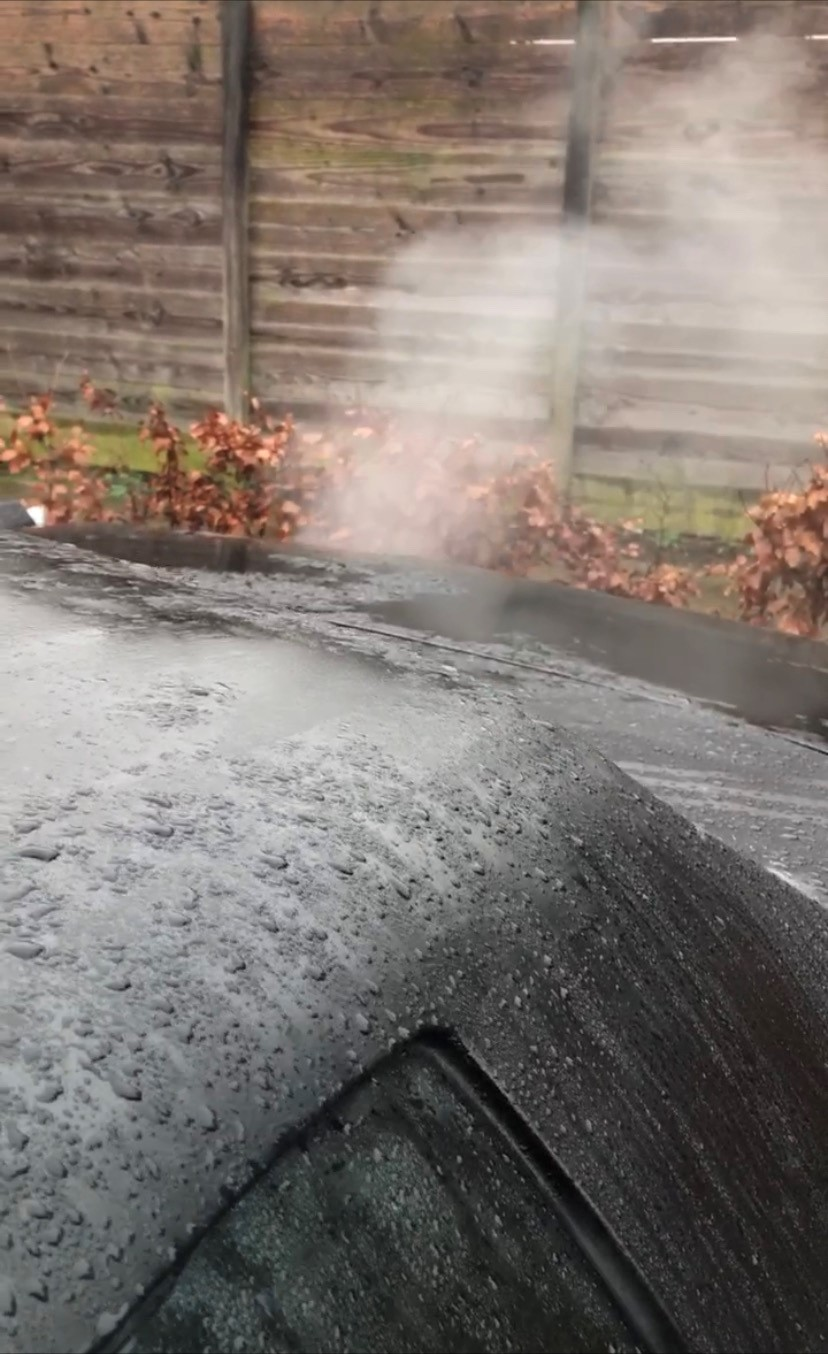
Cadillac Eldorado cold start

A cold start is an attempt to start a vehicle's engine when ambient temperatures are much lower than its normal operating temperature. A cold start can be difficult for an engine due to higher viscosity of oil and fuel in cold temperatures.

Generally speaking, diesel engines have more difficulty starting at low outside temperatures than gasoline engines. Diesel engines do not use spark plugs to ignite the air fuel mixture and rely only on the heat generated by compression alone to ignite the fuel. In extremely low ambient temperature diesel fuel can gel which can completely stop the fuel from flowing.

== Causes of cold starts ==
Cold starts are more difficult than starting a vehicle that has been run recently (typically between 90 minutes and 2 hours). More effort is needed to turn over a cold engine for multiple reasons:

- The engine compression is higher as the lack of heat makes ignition more difficult.
- Low temperatures cause engine oil to become more viscous, making it more difficult to circulate the oil.
- Air becomes more dense the cooler it is. This affects the air-fuel ratio, which in turn affects the flammability of the mixture.
- Fuel becomes thicker because the paraffin wax in the fuel is thicker at low temperatures (most common in diesel engines).

== Solutions to cold starting ==
The problem of cold starting has been greatly reduced since the introduction of engine starters, which are now commonplace on all modern vehicles. The higher rpm that can be achieved using electric starter motors improves the chance of successful ignition.

Starting fluid, a volatile liquid, is sometimes sprayed into the combustion chamber of an engine to assist the starting procedure.

Diesel engines make use of glow plugs to heat the combustion chamber prior to ignition, improving the conditions inside the engine, while certain manufacturers have incorporated a block heater, which heats the engine block prior to ignition to reduce the problem of cold starting.

In the early 1940s diesel engines fitted in tractors were started by use of a flamethrower to heat up the air that goes into the cylinder. That way the cylinder was heated so that the diesel could ignite more easily.
