= Ignition switch =

Switch in motor vehicles

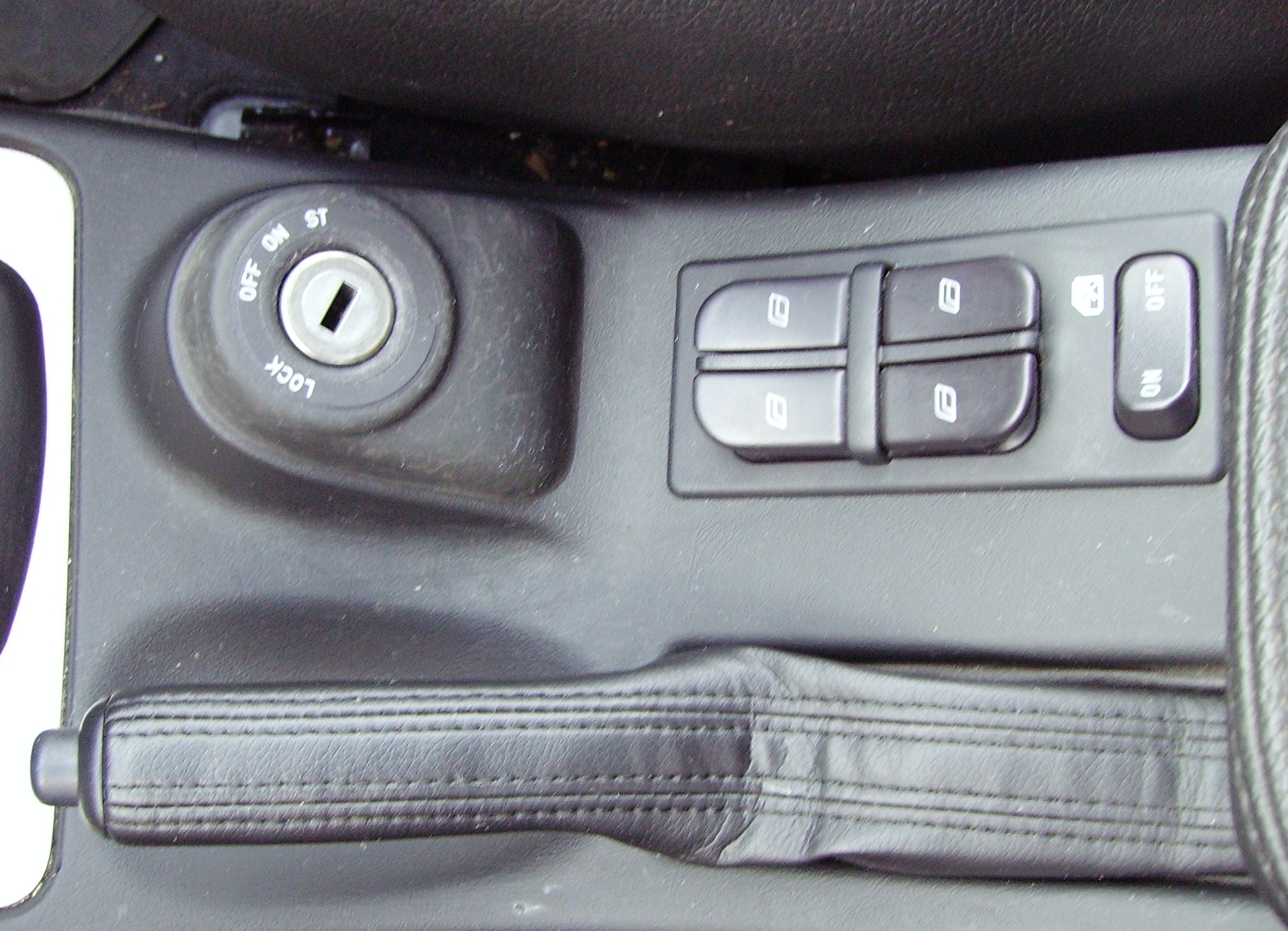
Ignition switch on a Saab 9-5

An ignition switch, starter switch or start switch is a switch in the control system of a motor vehicle that activates the main electrical systems for the vehicle, including "accessories" (radio, power windows, etc.). In vehicles powered by internal combustion engines, the switch provides power to the starter solenoid and the ignition system components (including the engine control unit and ignition coil), and is frequently combined with the starter switch which activates the starter motor.

Historically, ignition switches were key switches that requires the proper key to be inserted in order for the switch functions to be unlocked. These mechanical switches remain common in modern vehicles, further combined with an immobiliser to only activate the switch functions when a transponder signal in the key is detected. However, many new vehicles have been equipped with so-called "keyless" systems, which replace the key switch with a push button that also requires a transponder signal.

The ignition locking system may be sometimes bypassed by disconnecting the wiring to the switch and manipulating it directly; this is known as hotwiring.

Ignition switches are generally a simple repair that can be completed without much knowledge. They are generally vehicle-specific and plug and play.

== See also ==
- List of auto parts
- Remote keyless system
- Smart key
