= List of auto parts =

This is a list of auto parts, which are manufactured components of automobiles. This list reflects both fossil-fueled cars (using internal combustion engines) and electric vehicles; the list is not exhaustive. Many of these parts are also used on other motor vehicles such as trucks and buses.

== Car body and main parts ==
=== Body components, including trim ===
- Interior/cab/cabin
- Engine compartment
- Bonnet/hood
  - Bonnet/hood
  - Support stick
  - Hinges and springs
  - Car cover
- Bumper
  - Unexposed bumper
  - Exposed bumper
- Cowl screen
- Fender (wing or mudguard)
- Fascia
- Grille (also called grill)
- Pillar and hard trim
- Quarter panel
- Radiator core support
- Rocker
- Roof rack
- Spoiler
  - Front spoiler (air dam)
  - Rear spoiler (wing)
- Rims
  - Hubcap
  - Tire/Tyre
- Trim package
- Trunk/boot/hatch
  - Trunk/boot latch
  - Decklid
- Valance
- Welded assembly

=== Doors ===
- Anti-intrusion bar
- Outer door handle
- Inner door handle
- Door control module
- Door seal
- Door water-shield
- Hinge
- Door latch
- Door lock and power door locks
- Central locking
- Fuel tank (or fuel filler) door

=== Windows ===
- Glass
- Sunroof
  - Sunroof motor
- Sunroof Rail
- Sunroof Glass
- Window motor
- Window regulator
- Windshield (or windscreen)
  - Windshield washer (or windscreen wiper) motor
- Window seal

== Low voltage/auxiliary electrical system and electronics ==
=== Audio/video devices ===
- Antenna assembly
  - Antenna cable
- Radio and media player
- Speaker
- Tuner
- Subwoofer
- Video player

=== Cameras ===
- Backup camera
- Dashcam
- Digital Camera

=== Low voltage electrical supply system ===
- Alternator
- Battery
  - Performance Battery
  - Battery Box
  - Battery Cable terminal
  - Battery Cable
  - Battery Control system
  - Battery Plate
  - Battery tray
  - Battery Cap
  - Sulphuric Acid (American spelling: Sulfuric Acid) (H_{2}SO_{4})
  - Distilled Water
- Voltage regulator

=== Gauges and meters ===
- Ammeter
- Clinometer
- Dynamometer
- Fuel gauge
- Manometer
- Hydrometer
- Odometer (also called milometer or mileometers)
- Speedometer(also called a speed indicator)
- Tachometer (also called rev counters)
- Temperature gauge
- Tire pressure gauge
- Vacuum gauge
- Voltmeter
- Water temperature meter
- Oil pressure gauge

=== Ignition system ===
- Sparking cable/Spark plug wire
- Distributor
- Distributor Cap
- Distributor Rotor
- Electronic timing controller
- Ignition box
- Ignition switch
- Ignition cylinder/Ignition lock cylinder
- Ignition coil/coil pack
- Ignition Coil Connector
- Ignition coil parts
- Ignition magneto
- Spark plug
- Glow plug

=== Lighting and signaling system ===
- Engine bay lighting
- Fog light (also called foglamp)
- Spotlight
- Headlight (also called headlamp)
  - Headlight motor
- Interior light and lamp,
  - Center dome, Vanity-Sun visor and rear side, Floor and Door-front, back, Boot lamp or Trunk lamp
- License plate lamp (also called number plate lamp or registration plate lamp)
- Side lighting
- Brake light, Third or Center Brake light
- Tail light
  - Tail light cover
- Indicator light
- Turn signal control, also called the turn signal lever, also called the "turn signal stalk"

=== Sensors ===
- ABS Sensor
- Airbag sensors
- Automatic transmission speed sensor
- Brake sensor
- Camshaft position sensor
- Crankshaft position sensor
- Coolant temperature sensor
- Fuel level sensor
- Fuel pressure sensor
- Knock sensor
- Light sensor
- MAP sensor
- Mass airflow sensor
- Oil level sensor
- Oil pressure sensor
- Oxygen sensor (O_{2})
- Throttle position sensor

=== Starting system ===
- Starter
  - Starter drive
  - Starter pinion gear
  - Starter motor
  - Starter solenoid
- Glowplug

=== Electrical switches ===
- Battery
- Door switch
- Ignition switch
- Power window switch
- Steering column switch
- Switch cover
- Switch panel
- Thermostat
- Frame switch
- Fan ditch
- Parts and functions of starter system
- Neutral Safety Switch

=== Wiring harnesses ===
(wiring loom or cable loom)
- Air conditioning harness
- Engine compartment harness
- Interior harness
- Floor harness
- Main harness
- control harness

=== Miscellaneous ===
- Air bag control module
- Alarm and siren
- Central locking system
- Chassis control computer
- Cruise control computer
- Door contact
- Engine computer and management system
- Electronic control unit
- Engine control unit
- Fuse
  - Fuse box
- Ground strap
- Grab Handle
- Navigation system / GPS navigation device
- Performance chip
- Performance monitor
- Relay connector
- Remote lock
- Shift improver
- Speed controller
- Speedometer calibrator
- Transmission computer
- Wiring connector

== Interior ==
Also referred to as the cab or cabin.

=== Floor components and parts ===
- Carpet and rubber and other floor material
- Center console (front and rear)

=== Other components ===
- Roll cage or exo cage
- Dashboard or dash panel

=== Car seat ===
- Armrest
- Bench seat
- Bucket seat
- Child safety seat
- Fastener
- Headrest
- Seat belt
- Seat bracket
- Seat cover
- Seat track
- Other seat components
- Back seat
- Front seat

== Power-train and chassis ==
=== Braking system ===
- Anti-lock braking system (ABS)
  - ABS steel pin
  - FR side sensor
  - FL side sensor
  - RR side sensor
  - RL side sensor
  - ABS motor circuit
- Adjusting mechanism (adjuster star wheel)
- Anchor
- Bleed nipple
- Brake backing plate
- Brake backing pad
- Brake cooling duct
- Brake disc
- Brake Fluid
- Brake drum
- Brake lining
- Brake pad
- Brake pedal
- Brake piston
- Brake pump
- Brake roll
- Brake rotor
- Brake servo
- Brake shoe
  - Brake lining
  - Shoe web
- Brake warning light
- Calibrated friction brake
- Caliper
- Combination valve
- Dual circuit brake system
- Hold-down springs (retainer springs)
- Hose
  - Brake booster hose
  - Air brake nylon hose
  - Brake duct hose
- Hydraulic booster unit
- Load-sensing valve
- Master cylinder
- Metering valve
- Park brake lever/handle (hand brake)
- Pressure differential valve
- Proportioning valve
- Reservoir
- Shoe return spring
- Tyre
- Vacuum brake booster
- Wheel cylinder (slave cylinder)
- Wheel stud

=== Electrified powertrain components ===
- Electric motor
  - Induction motor
  - Synchronous motor
- High voltage battery pack
- Battery management system
  - Nickel–metal hydride battery
  - Lithium-ion battery
- Fuel cell
- Hydrogen tank
- DC-DC converter
- Inverter
- Charge port
  - SAE J1772 (Type 1 connector)
  - Type 2 connector
  - CHAdeMO
  - CCS
- Thermal management system
  - Radiator
  - Fan
  - Antifreeze
- Charger

=== Engine components and parts ===
- Diesel engine, petrol engine (gasoline engine)
- Accessory belt
- Air duct
- Air intake housing
- Air intake manifold
- Camshaft
  - Camshaft bearing
  - Camshaft fastener
  - Camshaft follower
  - Camshaft locking plate
  - Camshaft pushrod
  - Camshaft spacer ring
  - Camshaft phase variator
- Connecting rod
  - Connecting rod bearing
  - Connecting rod bolt
  - Connecting rod washer
- Crank case
- Crank pulley
- Crankshaft
  - Crankshaft oil seal (or rear main seal)
- Cylinder head
  - Cylinder head cover
  - Other cylinder head cover parts
  - Cylinder head gasket
- Distributor
- Distributor cap
- Drive belt
- Engine block
- Engine cradle
- Engine shake damper and vibration absorber
- Engine valve
- Fan belt
- Gudgeon pin (wrist pin)
- Harmonic balancer
- Heater
- Mounting
- Piston
  - Piston pin and crank pin
  - Piston pin bush
  - Piston ring and circlip
- Poppet valve
- Positive crankcase ventilation valve (PCV valve)
- Pulley part
- Rocker arm
- Rocker cover
- Starter motor
  - Starter pinion
  - Starter ring
- Turbocharger and Supercharger
- Tappet
- Timing belt
- Timing tape
- Valve cover
- Valve housing
- Valve spring
- Valve stem seal
- Water pump pulley

=== Engine cooling system ===
- Air blower
- Coolant hose (clamp)
- Cooling fan
- Fan belt
- Fan clutch
- Radiator
  - Radiator bolt
  - Radiator (fan) shroud
  - Radiator gasket
  - Radiator pressure cap
  - Overflow tank
  - Thermostat
- Water neck
- Water neck o-ring
- Water pipe
- Water pump
- Water pump gasket
- Water tank

=== Engine oil systems ===
- Oil filter
- Oil gasket
- Oil pan
- Oil pipe
- Oil pump
- Oil strainer
- Oil suction filter

=== Exhaust system ===
- Catalytic converter
- Exhaust clamp and bracket
- Exhaust flange gasket
- Exhaust gasket
- Exhaust manifold
- Exhaust manifold gasket
- Exhaust pipe
- Heat shield
- Heat sleeving and tape
- Resonator
- Muffler (Silencer)
- Spacer ring

=== Fuel supply system ===
- Air filter
- Carburetor
- Choke cable
- Exhaust gas recirculation valve (EGR valve)
- Fuel cap or fuel filler cap
- Fuel cell
  - Fuel cell component
- Fuel cooler
- Fuel distributor
- Fuel filter
- Fuel filter seal
- Fuel injector
- Fuel injector nozzle
- Fuel vapor canister, also known as a charcoal canister
- Fuel line
- Fuel pump
- Fuel pump gasket
- Fuel pressure regulator
- Fuel rail
- Fuel tank
  - Fuel tank cover
- Fuel water separator
- Intake manifold
- Intake manifold gasket
- LPG (Liquefied petroleum gas) system assembly
- Throttle body

=== Suspension and steering systems ===
- Axle
- Ball joint
- Beam axle
- Camber arm
- Control arm
- Idler arm
- Kingpin
- Lateral link
- Panhard rod
- Pitman arm
- Power steering assembly and component
- Rack end
- Shock absorber
- Spindle
- Spring
  - Air spring
  - Coil spring
  - Leaf and parabolic leaf spring
  - Rubber spring
  - Spiral spring
- Stabilizer bars and link
- Steering arm
- Steering box
- Steering pump
- Steering column assembly
- Steering rack (a form of steering gear; see also rack and pinion and recirculating ball)
- Steering shaft
- Steering wheel (driving wheel)
- Strut
- Stub axle
- Suspension link and bolt
- Tie Rod End
- Trailing arm

=== Transmission system ===
- Adjustable pedal
- Axle shaft
- Bell housing
- Universal joint
- Carrier assembly
- Chain wheel and sprocket
- Clutch assembly
- Clutch cable
- Clutch disk
- Clutch fan
- Clutch fork
- Clutch hose
- Clutch lever
- Clutch lining
  - Clutch pedal
  - Clutch pressure plate
  - Clutch shoe
  - Clutch spring
- Differential
  - Differential case
    - Pinion bearing
    - Differential clutch
    - Spider gears
    - Differential casing
  - Differential flange
  - Differential gear
  - Differential seal
- Flywheel
  - Flywheel ring gear
  - Flywheel clutch
- Gear
  - Gear coupling
  - Gear pump
  - Gear ring
  - Gear stick (gear-stick, gear lever, selection lever, shift stick, gear shifter)
- Gearbox
- Idler gear
- Knuckle
- Master cylinder
- Output shaft
- Pinion
- Planetary gear set
- Prop shaft (drive shaft, propeller shaft)
- Shift cable
- Shift fork
- Shift knob
- Slave cylinder
- Speed reducer
- Speedometer gear
- Steering gear
- Torque converter
- Trans-axle housing
- Transfer case
- Transmission gear
- Transmission pan
- Transmission seal and bonded piston
- Transmission spring
- Transmission yoke

== Miscellaneous auto parts ==
=== Air conditioning system (A/C) ===
- Automobile air conditioning
- A/C clutch
- A/C compressor
- A/C condenser filter
- A/C hose high pressure
- A/C relay
- A/C valve
- A/C expansion valve
- A/C low-pressure valve
- A/C Schroeder valve
- A/C inner plate
- A/C cooler
- A/C suction hose pipe
- A/C discharge hose pipe
- A/C gas receiver
- Cabin air filter (British English: pollen filter)
- Condenser
- Evaporator

=== Bearings ===
- Grooved ball bearing
- Needle bearing
- Roller bearing
- Sleeve bearing
- Wheel bearing

=== Hose ===
- Fuel vapour hose
- Reinforced hose (high-pressure hose)
- Non-reinforced hose
- Radiator hose

=== Other miscellaneous parts ===
- Adhesive tape and foil
- Air bag
- Bolt cap
  - License plate bracket
- Cables
  - Speedometer cable
- Cotter pin
- Dashboard
  - Center console
  - Glove compartment
- Drag link
- Dynamic seal
- Emblem/badge
- Fastener
- Gasket: flat, moulded, profiled
- Hood and trunk release cable
- Horn and trumpet horn
- Injection-molded parts
- Instrument cluster
- Label
- Mirror
- Phone mount
- Name plate
- Nut
  - Flange nut
  - Hex nut
- O-ring
- Paint
- Rivet
- Rubber (extruded and molded)
- Screw
- Shim
- Sun visor
- Washer

== See also ==
- 42-volt electrical system
- Fuel economy in automobiles
- Spare parts management
- Electric car
- Wheel sizing
