= Bendix drive =

Mechanism used in internal combustion engines

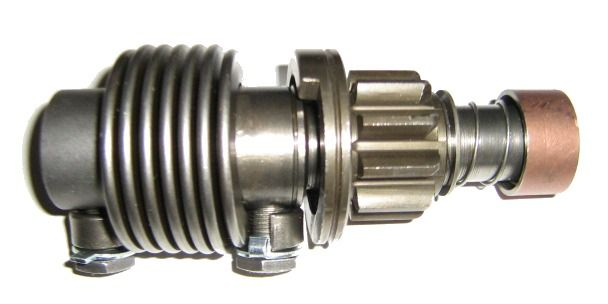
Bendix drive

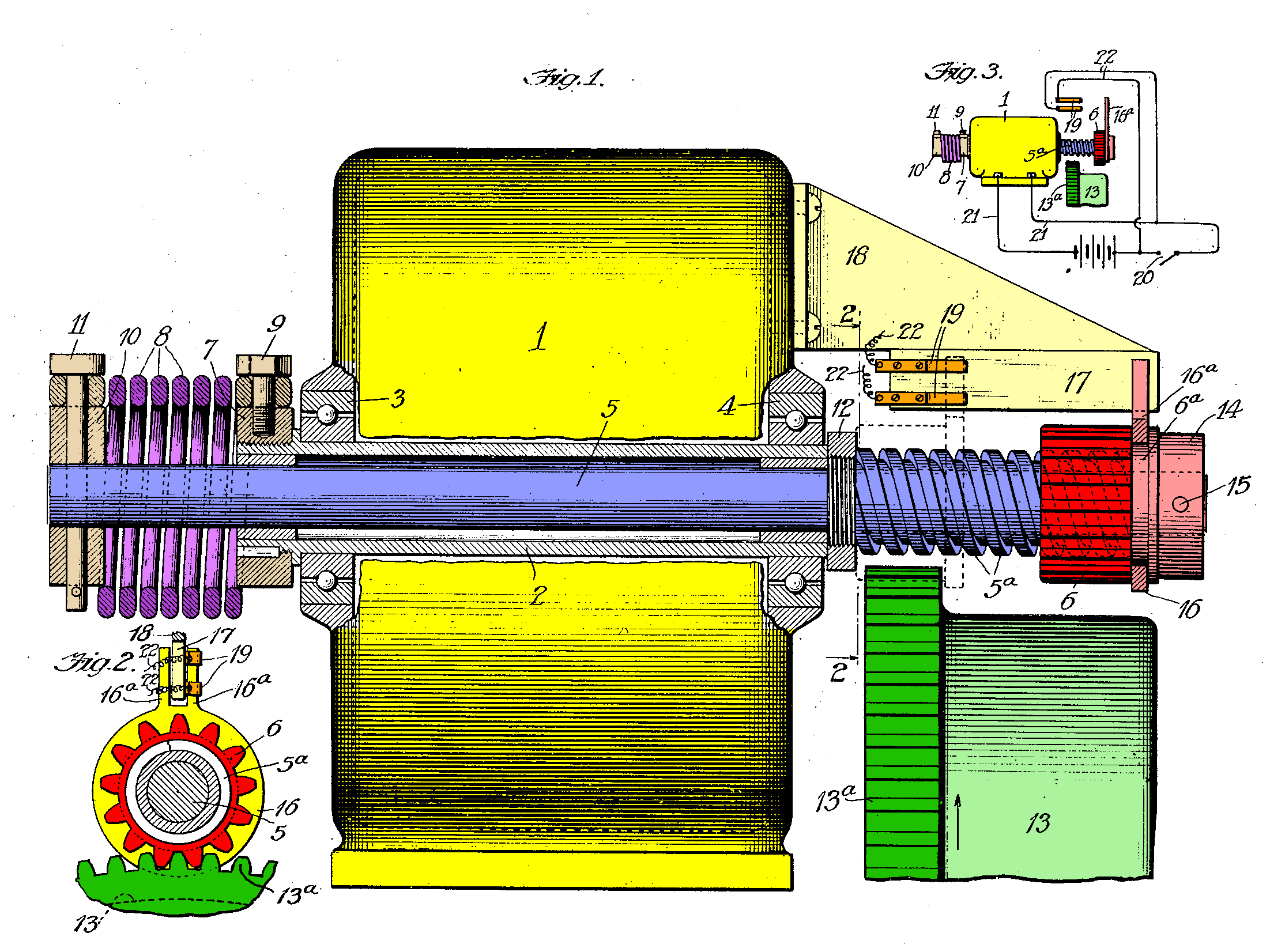
Patent Drawing (colored): 1: electric motor; 5: rotatable screw shaft; 6: pinion; 8: coiled spring; 13: flywheel

A Bendix drive is a type of engagement mechanism used in starter motors of internal combustion engines. The device allows the pinion gear of the starter motor to engage or disengage the ring gear (which is attached to the flywheel or flexplate of the engine) automatically when the starter is powered or when the engine fires, respectively. It is named after its inventor, Vincent Hugo Bendix.

== Operation ==
The Bendix system places the starter drive pinion on a helically-splined drive shaft of the starter motor. When the starter motor first begins turning, the inertia of the drive pinion assembly momentarily resists rotation even though the shaft through its center is turning. Since the pinion has internal splines matching those on the drive shaft, this causes the pinion gear to slide axially to make initial side contact with the gear teeth on ring gear of the engine. The pinion then rotates enough to allow the gears to mesh, after which the pinion then continues along the shaft to reach a stop on the end of its allowed travel, at which point the gears are fully meshed. Since the pinion gear can no longer travel axially, it must then turn with the drive shaft and begins to drive the ring gear. When the engine starts, backdrive from the ring gear causes the drive pinion to exceed the rotational speed of the starter, at which point the drive pinion is forced back along the helical spline and out of mesh with the ring gear.

The torque of the starter motor is transferred to the starter motor drive shaft through a heavy-duty coiled spring. When the starter motor powers and drives the pinion to engage with the flywheel, this spring cushions the rotational impact as the gears and mesh and begin turning together.

The main drawback to the Bendix drive is that it relies on a certain amount of "clash" between the teeth of the pinion and the ring gears before they slip into place and mate completely; the teeth of the pinion are already spinning when they come into contact with the static ring gear, and unless they happen to align perfectly at the moment they engage, the pinion teeth will strike the teeth of the ring gear side-to-side rather than face-to-face, and continue to rotate until both align. This increases wear on both sets of teeth, although the pinion gear typically wears more due to being made of a softer material than the ring gear, because the pinion gear is more easily replaced. For this reason the Bendix drive has been largely superseded in starter motor design by the pre-engagement system using a starter solenoid.
