= Flame-start system =

Cold start aid for diesel engines

The flame-start system is a cold start aid for starting diesel engines at low ambient temperatures. It reduces the white smoke emission after the engine is started. In addition, it reduces the strain on the starter motor and batteries by shortening the start-up time.

Usually, the suction intake air is heated up in commercial vehicles to improve the starting capacity and emissions. The heating power requirement in large capacity diesel engines leads here to the use of flame starting systems, with a small diesel burner in the air intake acting as a heater.
