= Interior light =

An interior light is a type of light that is generally used to illuminate the cabin of a vehicle. Interior lighting setups can vary greatly in both complexity and size, and certain vehicles, depending on a number of factors, may use simpler, more utilitarian lighting configurations, or choose to incorporate grander systems (known as ambient lighting).

== Application in automobiles ==
=== Courtesy, overhead, and dome lights ===
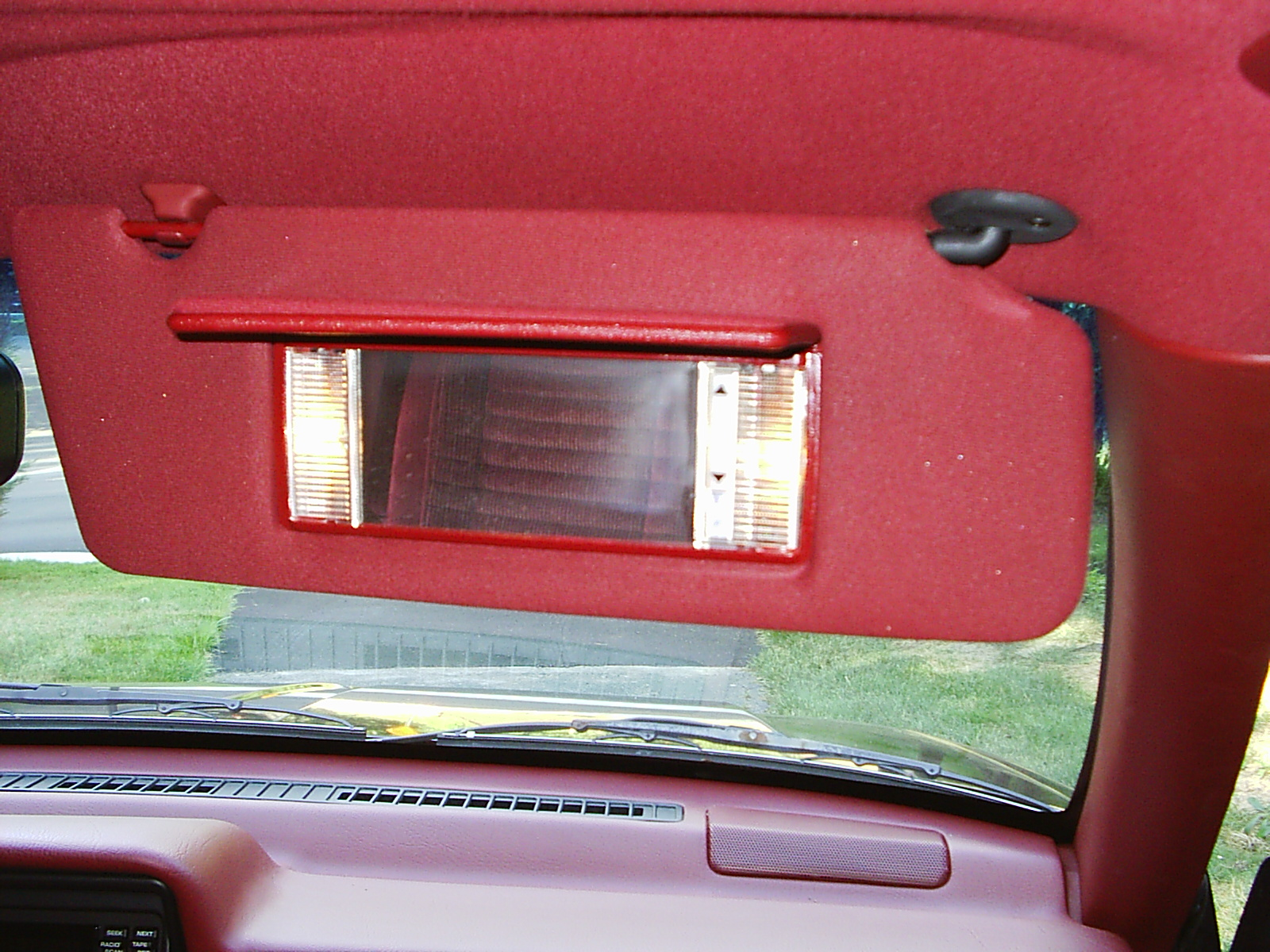
Interior lights built into a vanity mirror (1993 Jeep Grand Cherokee Laredo)

Many economy vehicles use more prosaic interior lighting systems, which is common as these types of vehicles tend to be much more affordable. These systems are usually in the form of overhead, dome, or courtesy lights, which are driver/passenger actuated and can generally be toggled via some button that can be easily located in the interior while driving or when parked. (For example, in the vehicle's sun visor, or built directly into the roof).

Dome lights are the brightest and largest of these simple lighting systems. They also tend to, at least partially, illuminate the entire vehicle, rather than just the front or back seats, and are usually built into the car's ceiling. (often between both areas of the cabin to maximize effect).

Overhead lights are similar to dome lights in the sense that they are brighter, but are, for the most part, limited to the front seats.

Courtesy lights are much smaller, and are generally intended to illuminate small areas of the cabin (or other areas of the vehicle) such as the trunk or glove compartment.

=== Ambient lighting systems ===
Luxury vehicles, particularly newer models, tend to incorporate more complex systems that create a sense of ambiance while driving. Certain ultra-luxury manufacturers, such as Rolls-Royce, take this philosophy further, allowing buyers to completely customize the type of lighting system they desire before finally taking ownership of the car. The lighting system, dubbed "Starlight Headliner" by Rolls-Royce, is made completely by hand by workers at their factory in England.
