= Glow plug =

Heating element used to aid in starting diesel engines

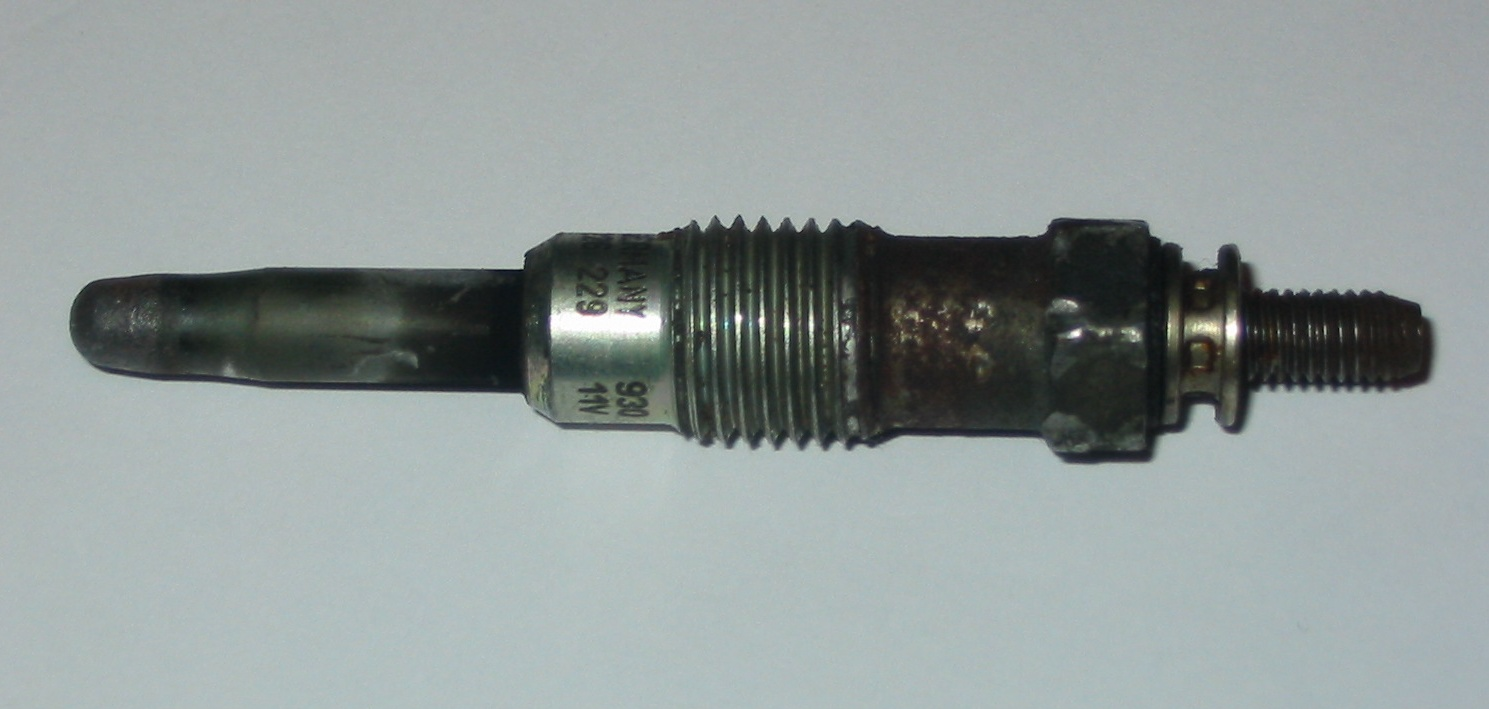
A typical glowplug

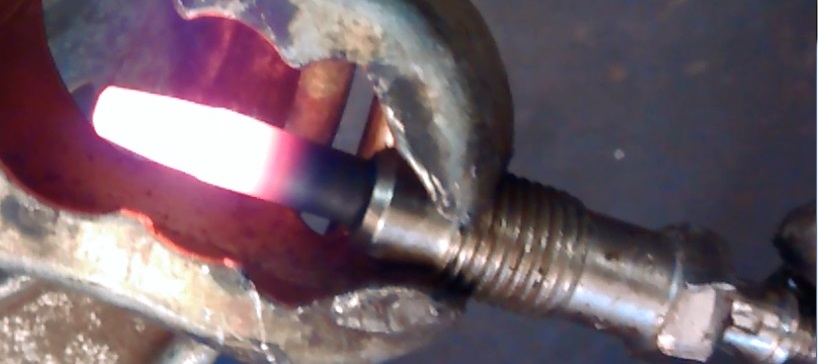
Glowplug in operation

In a diesel engine, a glow plug (also spelled glowplug) is a heating device used to aid starting of the engine in cold weather. This device is a pencil-shaped piece of metal with an electric heating element at the tip.

A glowplug system consists of either a single glowplug in the inlet manifold, or one glowplug per cylinder. In older systems, the driver is required to manually activate the glowplug system and wait approximately 20 seconds before starting the engine. Newer systems automatically activate the glowplug(s) before the engine is started and have a quicker warm-up time.

== Design ==
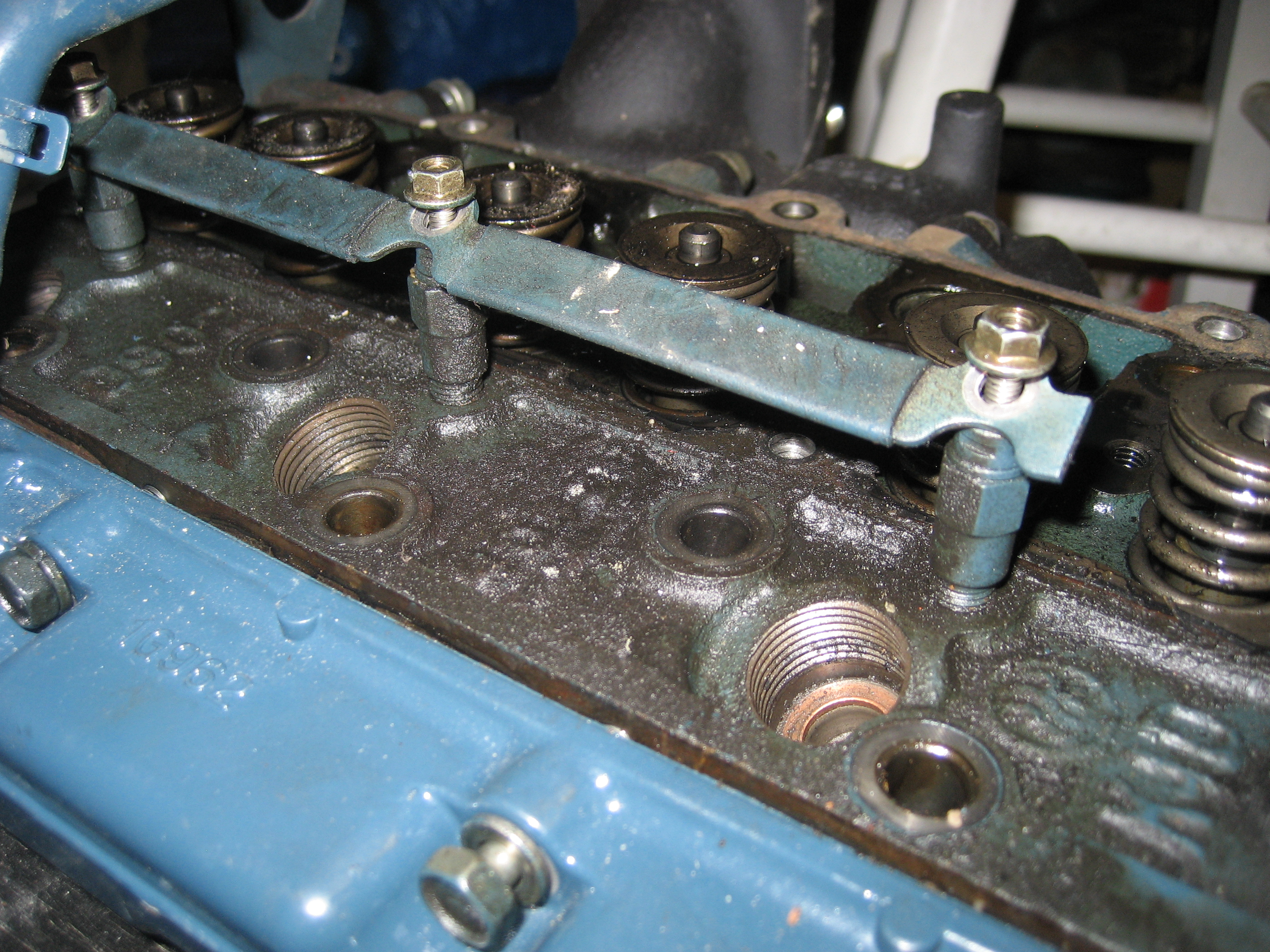
Glow plugs installed in a small engine (beneath the horizontal bar)

Glowplugs are typically used as starting-aid devices, when the engine is being cranked by a starter motor, and in most cases switched off when the engine has reached a defined minimum operating temperature. Diesel engines, unlike common spark-ignition engines, do not use spark plugs to ignite the air-fuel mixture. Instead, they rely solely on compression to raise the temperature of the air to a point where the fuel combusts spontaneously when introduced to the hot, high pressure air. When the engine's surroundings are cold, the air's thermal energy – that it has previously received from the starter motor's compression work – is absorbed by the cylinder head and engine block, and eventually transferred to the air surrounding the engine. When the temperature of the air surrounding the engine comes below a certain value, depending upon cylinder head design, (40 °C for precombustion chamber injected, 20 °C for swirl chamber injected, and 0 °C for direct injected engines), the engine loses too much compression heat to reliably initiate combustion, and the engine fails to start. Glow plugs are used to help overcome this issue by introducing additional heat energy into the combustion chambers.

A glowplug resembles a short metal pencil. The heating element is fitted into its tip. Glowplug filaments must be made of certain materials, such as platinum and iridium, that resist oxidation and withstand high temperature. Certain diesel engines (especially direct-injection engines) do not use starting-aid devices such as glowplugs. Engines with a displacement of more than one litre per cylinder usually incorporate a flame-start system rather than glowplugs, if a starting aid system is required.

== Activation method ==
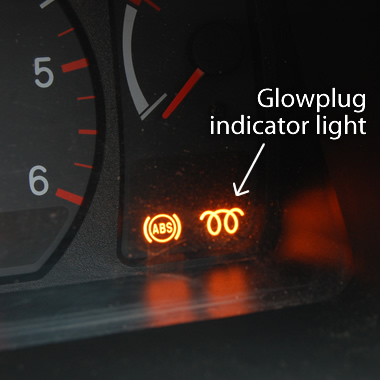
Glowplug indicator light in the dashboard of a car

For older vehicles, the driver needs to activate the glow plug for approximately 20 seconds before starting the engine. This is achieved by leaving the ignition switch in the "on" position, and only moving it to "start" once the glowplug has finished pre-heating the engine. Once the engine is running, some cars continue to use the glowplugs until the engine has reached its operating temperature, in order to reduce the diesel exhaust emissions. Similarly, some engines re-activate the glowplugs if the temperature of an engine under light loads reduces below a certain threshold, in order to improve the efficiency of the engine.

Many modern engines automatically activate the glowplugs when the operator unlocks the vehicle or opens the door to the car, thus simplifying the process and shortening the waiting time the operator has to wait before the engine will start. In addition, the time needed to pre-heat the engine is typically 6-8 seconds. Some vehicles include a warning light on the dashboard that extinguishes once the engine is pre-heated.

== See also ==
- Block heater
- List of auto parts
