= Louise Bazalgette =

British motorist (1846 – 1918)

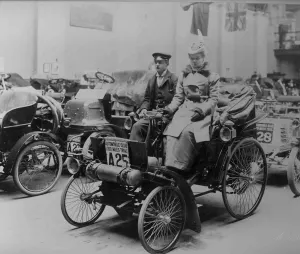
- in her Benz
- Born: Louise Seville; 1846; Essex
- Died: 9 March 1918 (aged 71–72); Marylebone
- Occupation: motorist
- Known for: driving long distances
- Spouse: George Bazalgette
- Partner: Henry Hewetson

Louise Bazalgette born Louise Seville (1846 – 9 March 1918) was an early British motorist. She was present at the Emancipation Run in 1896 when car owners celebrated being able to exceed 4 mph. She was widely reported as a woman who was making long trips in a car. She was the only woman to enter the three week long Thousand Mile Trial in 1900.

== Life ==
Bazalgette was born in 1845 or 1846 in Essex where her father John Seville was a farmer. She was living in London in 1870 when she married George Bazalgette. He was fifteen years older than her and a marine. The noted civil engineer Joseph Bazalgette was her husband's cousin. Her husband died in 1885 and she moved and started a boarding house.

== Cars ==
Henry Hewetson who was a businessman from Tunbridge Wells had bought a Benz car while on a trip to Germany. In 1895 or 1896 he and his partner Walter Arnold opened a showroom near to where Bazalgette was now living off Portman Square. Bazalgette bought a car and her journeys made the newspapers because they were considered long and they were made by a woman driver.

Bazelgette and her friend Hewetson were photographed at the historic "emancipation run" on 14 November 1896, which is still celebrated by the London to Brighton Veteran Car Run. This was the first time that cars were allowed to do 14 mph and it was the first meeting of the Automobile Club (for male drivers). Bazelgette was on an Arnold motor car.

In 1899 she floated the idea of a women's automobile club. Women were not allowed to join the Automobile Club although she gave a talk to them on the subject. She said that she had been driving for three or four years at speeds up to 14 miles per hour travelling over 2,000 miles but with a trained mechanic in case of breakdowns. She noted that driving a car only required skill and not strength so there was no barrier to women driving. However they lacked the knowledge of technical terms and she proposed that the new club would give women the knowledge of how their cars worked.

In 1900 she was the only woman to enter the Thousand Mile Trial in 1900. The event was a test of drivers but its purpose was to popularise motoring. She completed the course which ran from 23 April to 12 May starting and ending in London with Edinburgh being their destination. She drove over 560 miles and her mechanic drove 530 miles in their car that was open to the wet and windy weather.

In the 1911 census she and Henry Hewetson were living at 3 Old Quebec Street in London. Before Louise Bazalgette died in Marylebone in 1918, she realised that there was no room beside her husband's grave for her. She had her husband moved to a new location in 1890 so that they could be buried beside each other in Kensal Green Cemetery.
