= Arnold (automobile) =

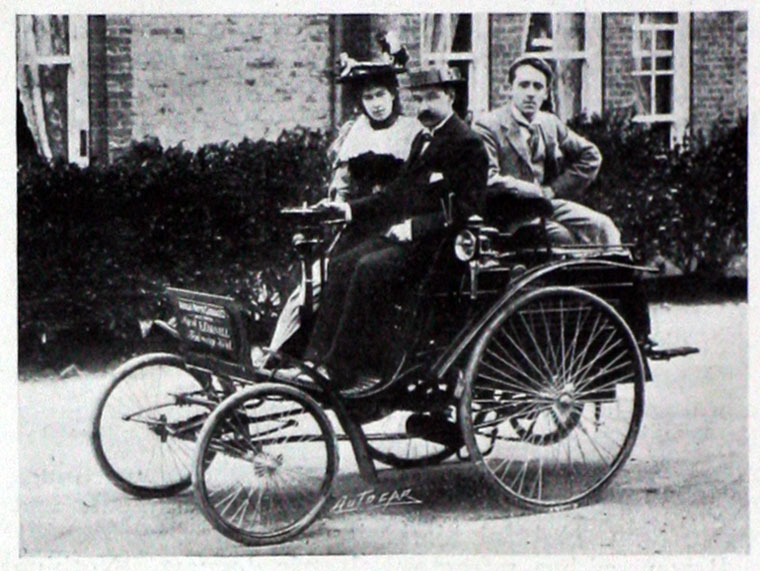
Arnold-Benz, driven by Alfred Cornell, 1897.

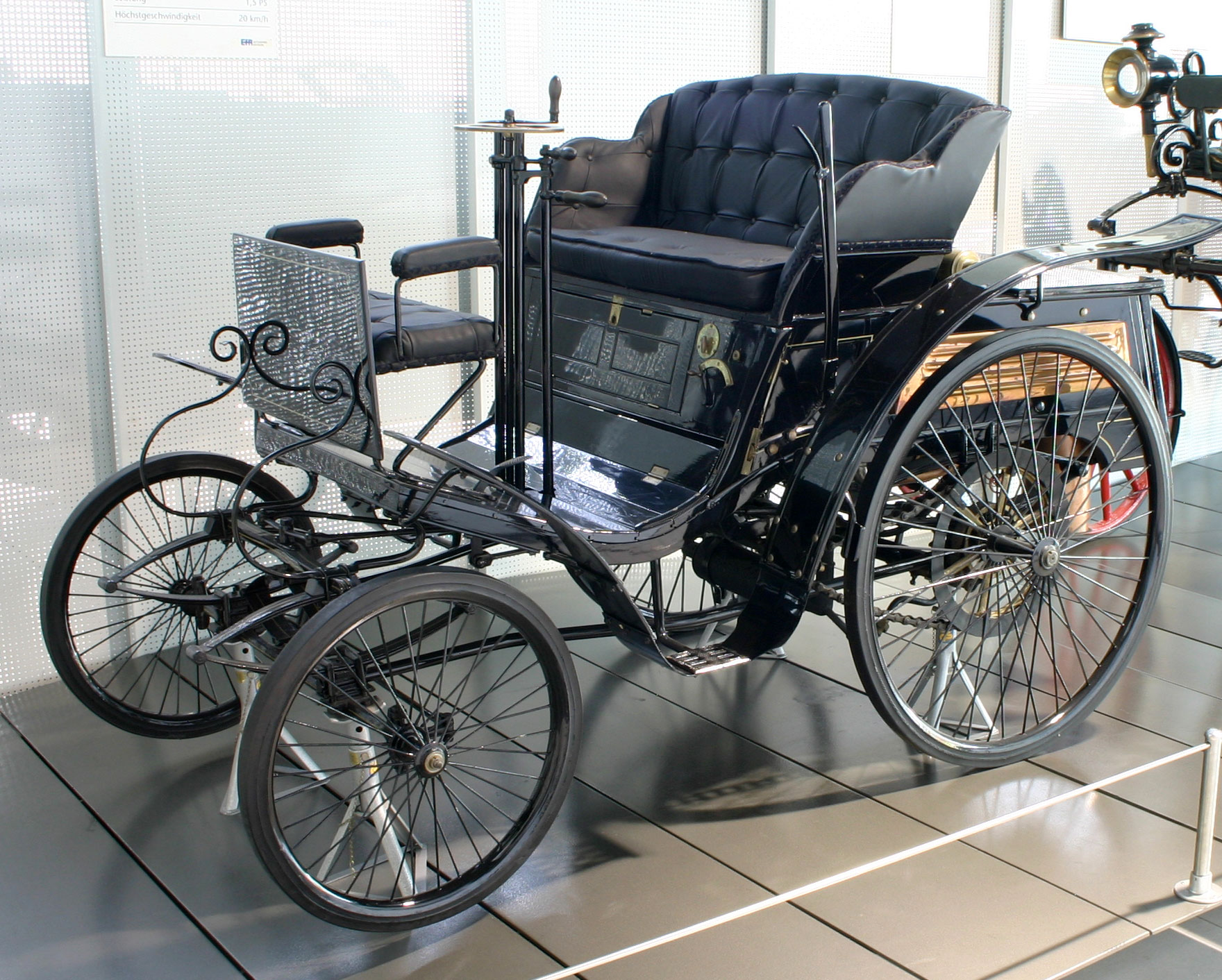
The Arnold was based on the Benz Velo (pictured)

The Arnold was one of the first motor cars manufactured in the United Kingdom. It was produced in East Peckham, Kent between 1896 and 1898.

== History ==
William Arnold & Sons of East Peckham, Kent, was an agricultural engineering company founded in about 1844.

In 1895 they acquired a licence to build Benz cars. As the Arnold Motor Carriage Co. from 1896 to 1898. the firm built twelve cars patterned after the Benz but fitted with their own engines. Two Arnolds were exhibited at Crystal Palace in 1896.

Louise Bazalgette and William Arnold's partner, Henry Hewetson, were photographed at the historic "emancipation run" which is the race still celebrated by the London to Brighton Veteran Car Run. This was the first time that cars were allowed to do 14 mph and it was the first meeting of the Automobile Club (for male drivers). Bazalgette was driving an Arnold motor car.

One Arnold from 1896 was fitted with one of the world's first self-starters, by electrical engineer Herbert John Dowsing. This was a dynamotor coupled to the flywheel, designed to assist the car on hills and well as starting the engine.

Two Arnold cars survive.

On 28 January 1896 Walter Arnold, of the Arnold (automobile) company of East Peckham, was summonsed for travelling at 8 mph (13 km/h) in a motorised vehicle, thereby exceeding the contemporary speed limit for towns of 2 mph (3.2 km/h). He had been caught by a policeman who had given chase on a bicycle. He was fined 1 shilling plus costs, the first speeding fine in England, and thus became the first person to be convicted of speeding in the UK.

In 1902 there was a Chilean car, probably inspired in this one, but that was named Ovalle-Hogdkinson "La Chancha" ("The Pig" because of the sound it did), that was revealed in April 1902, but stored in May of the same year and later dismantled. All components, except for Michelin-imposed tires, were produced by the same Ovalle-Hogdkinson brand

== See also ==
- List of car manufacturers of the United Kingdom
