= Slipper clutch =

Type of clutch designed for motorcycles

A slipper clutch (also known as a back-torque limiter) is a specialized clutch with an integrated freewheel mechanism, developed for performance-oriented motorcycles to mitigate the effects of engine braking when riders decelerate.

The main purpose of a slipper clutch is to prevent over engine rev and rear wheel hop (or clatter) especially under hard braking in a vehicle (usually performance motorcycles). It does so by partially slipping until the engine's speed matches with the vehicle's speed upon sudden braking.

== Design ==
The slipper clutch consists of two bases, one with dog clutches and ramps with ball bearings, a splined hub, and clutch plates. In normal operation, the dog clutches mate, driving the transmission. When a back torque comes from the transmission, the splined hub slides up the bearing ramps, disconnecting from the clutch plates and allowing a limited slip between input and output.

This type of clutch is designed to partially disengage or "slip" when the rear wheel tries to drive the engine faster than it would run under its own power. The engine braking forces in conventional clutches will normally be transmitted back along the drive chain causing the rear wheel to hop, chatter or lose traction. This is especially noted on larger displacement four-stroke engines, which have greater engine braking than their two-stroke or smaller displacement counterparts. Slipper clutches eliminate this extra loading on the rear suspension, giving riders a more predictable ride and minimize the risk of over-revving the engine during downshifts. Slipper clutches can also prevent a catastrophic rear wheel lockup in case of engine seizure. Generally, the amount of force needed to disengage the clutch is adjustable to suit the application.

Slipper clutches have also been used to a lesser extent on automobiles, primarily those powered by motorcycle engines. They can also be found on racing remote control cars. Some experimental aircraft use a slipper clutch to control torsional resonance in the drive train and protect the engine from shock in the event of a propeller strike. A slipper clutch for an automobile was patented with a French priority date of 1953 to J.Maurice et al. The principle of this slipper is identical to that used in modern motorcycles.

One-way sprag clutches have also been used for the same purpose, but are generally not adjustable for disengagement force. Early Honda Shadow models used a design wherein a sprag clutch is connected to just half of the clutch friction plates, allowing the clutch to slip during heavy backloading sufficiently to prevent rear-wheel lockup, while still allowing moderate engine compression braking with the remaining friction plates.

== History ==
Slipper clutches have been used in most high displacement four stroke road racing motorcycles since the early 1980s, having been introduced on the Honda NR500 in 1982 in 500GP. Slipper clutches are now fitted to many current sport bikes.

== See also ==
- Freewheel
- Clutch
- Sprag clutch
