= Sun visor =

Automobile driver aid

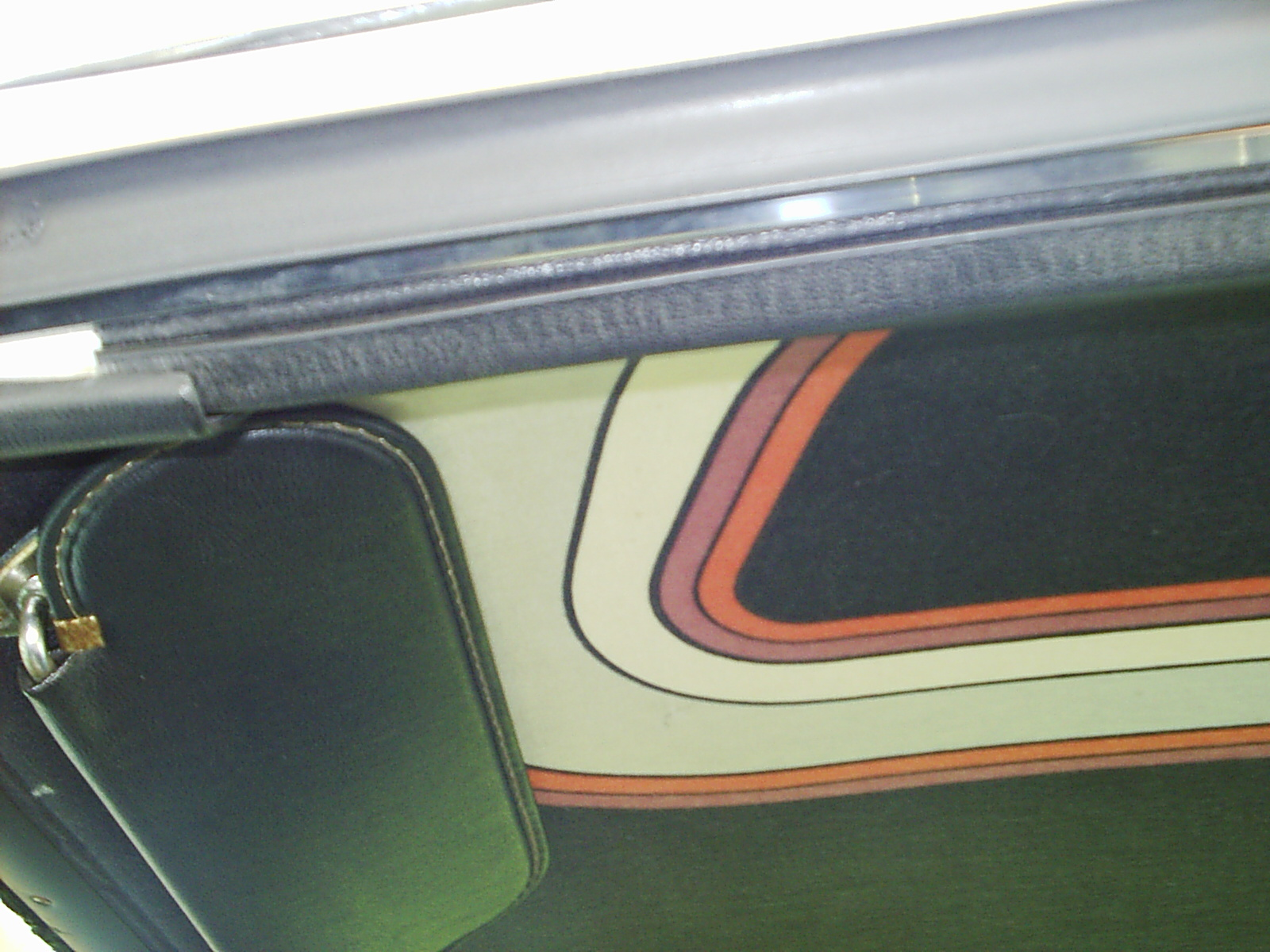
Driver's sun visor in the up position below the Pierre Cardin headliner in a 1972 AMC Javelin

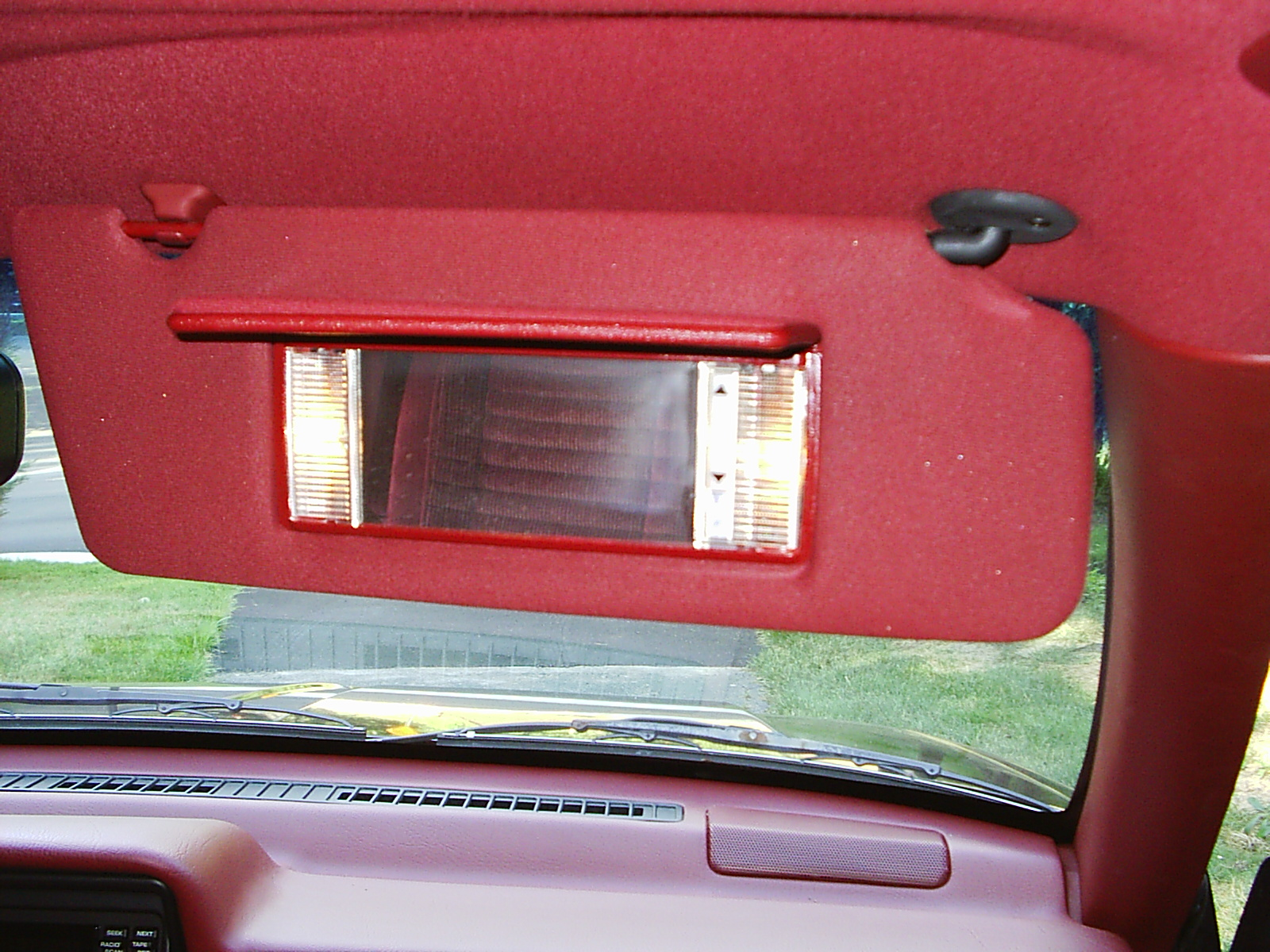
Passenger's sun visor in down position with a lighted vanity mirror in a 1993 Jeep Grand Cherokee

A sun visor is a component of an automobile located on the interior just above the windshield. They are designed with a hinged flap that is adjustable to help shade the eyes of drivers and passengers from the glare of sunlight.

== Design ==
Starting in 1924, automobiles such as the Ford Model T began to include an exterior sun visor on its closed body versions. The interior sun visor patent number 1908837 was filed on March 12, 1930 to Bion Cole Place, an inventor working for the Gagnier Fiber Products Company in Detroit.

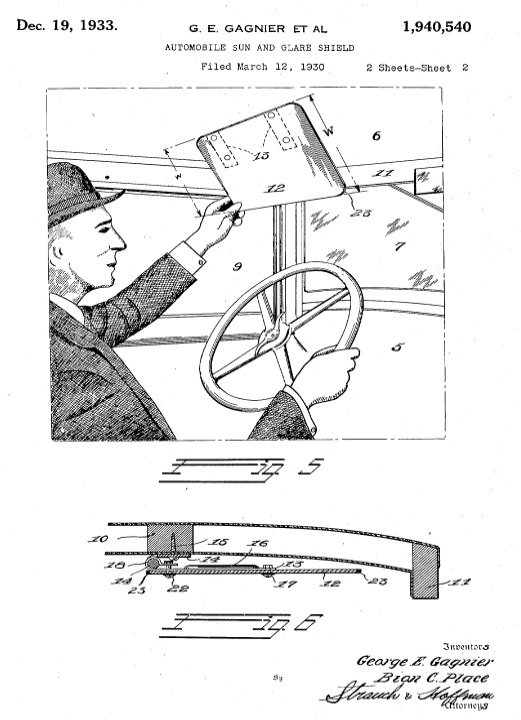
Illustration from the 1930 patent filing for the interior sun visor

Other early automobiles also had externally attached sun visors to their windshields until 1931, when interior mounts were introduced. As automobile design advanced with windshields mounted on an angle to lessen wind resistance, the outside or "cadet-type" sun visors were no longer seen on cars starting from 1932. Henceforth, sun visors were mounted inside the vehicle, making the hinged flap easier to reach and adjust.

Most modern cars have two sun visors, one for the driver's side and a second for the passenger's side, with the rear-view mirror often mounted in between the two sun visors. Each visor can be lowered to help block light from the sun entering through the windshield. Some are designed so they can be released from one bracket and be turned towards the side window, covering a small part of the window at the top to block the sunlight shining onto the side of the face. Some current visors can also be extended along the side window to block sunlight all of the way to the "B" pillar to block the light for the driver or passenger.

The sun visor's flap or core is typically made from pressboard with a piece of metal for its attachment onto a mounting bracket. Some are made of molded substrates or polypropylene. The mounting bracket is often a metal rod with a slight bend in the middle and a bracket that attaches it with screws to the sheet metal above the headliner. The bend in the rod serves to hold the visor flap in the desired position. The visor flap is covered with a material, most often to complement the interior of the vehicle. Padding on the sun visors became popular for the extra protection afforded to passengers. Such safety improvements included Ford's 1956 Lifeguard package and the seat belts, as well as padded dash and visors that were offered by 1957 on Rambler cars.

Some sun visors may incorporate a vanity mirror for the passenger's convenience. For many years, a visor mounted mirror was among popular dealer-added accessories that provided high-profit margins with the sales staff receiving extra incentives to sell them. In some cases, a flip-up or sliding cover over the mirror automatically turns on vanity lights, which can be adjusted with a dimmer control (see image).

Visors are also available as an option or as a standard item from manufacturers with a built-in remote garage door control, often referred to as a universal garage door opener.

Aftermarket exterior sun visors are available for trucks as cab visors.

Manufacturers and aftermarket suppliers are offering new sun visors with electronic features such as USB input slots and GPS systems.

== See also ==
- List of auto parts
