= Starter ring gear =

Internal combustion engine component

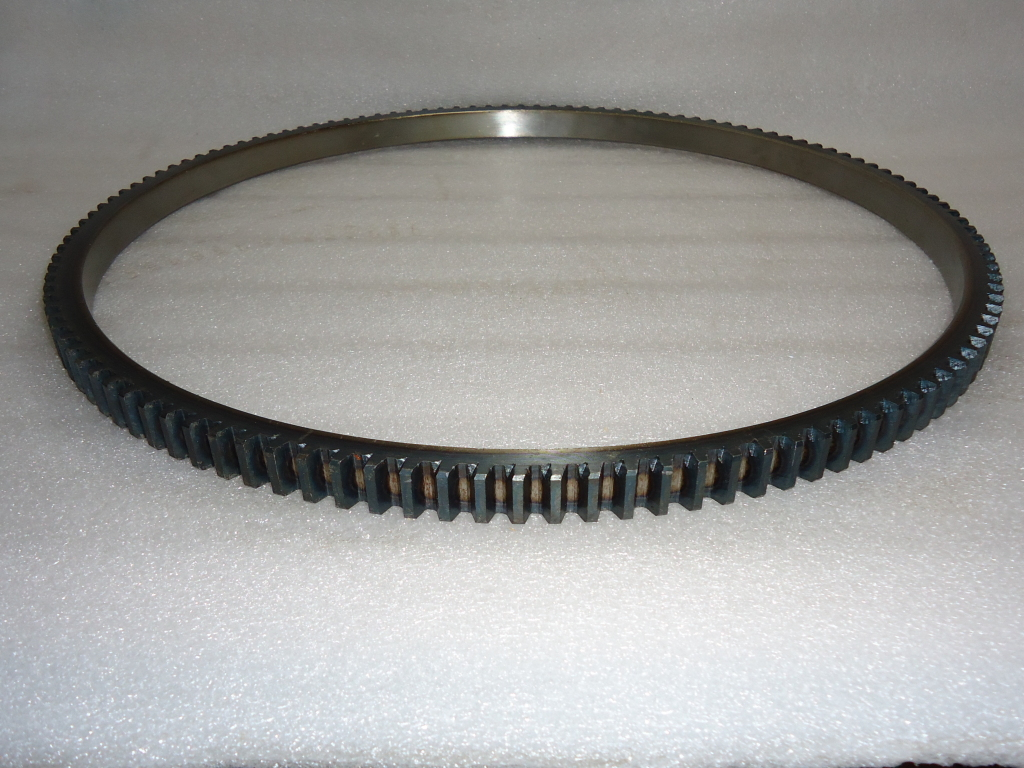
Typical starter ring gear

A starter ring gear is a part attached to an internal combustion engine that is part of the assembly which transfers the torque from the starter motor to the engine's crankshaft, in order to start the engine. The starter ring gear is usually made from medium carbon steel.

Starter ring gears are attached to either the flywheel or the flexplate of an engine. The teeth of the ring gear are driven by the smaller gear (known as the pinion) of the starter motor. The pinion engages the starter ring only during starting and once the engine is running the pinion withdraws.

== Manufacture ==
The starter ring gear is most commonly made by forming a length of square or rectangular steel bar into a circle and welding the ends together. This ring is then machined to create flat surfaces of the required inner and outer diameters. The gear teeth are then created using a hobbing tool, followed by processes to chamfer, deburr and clean the gear teeth. Then the teeth are hardened, heated typically with electrical induction, but sometimes, gas, prior to quenching. This gives the teeth wear resistance whilst keeping the body of the ring more 'elastic' to grip the flywheel.

== Attachment ==
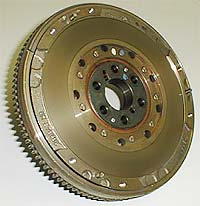
Starter ring gear attached to a flywheel

In cars with a manual transmission, the starter ring gear is fitted to the outer diameter of the flywheel. The ring gear is usually fixed to the flywheel through use of an interference fit, which is achieved by heating the ring gear and so that thermal expansion allows it to be placed around the flywheel.

In cars with an automatic transmission, the starter ring gear is usually welded to the outside of the flexplate.

== See also ==
- Flywheel
- Starter motor
