= Flexplate =

Metal disk connecting car parts

A flexplate or flex plate is a metal disk that connects the output from an engine to the input of a torque converter in a car equipped with an automatic transmission. It takes the place of the flywheel found in a conventional manual transmission setup.

== Design ==
The name refers to the ability of the disk to flex along its main axis to account for gear changes and/or small misalignments as rotational speeds change. Flexplates are generally much thinner and lighter than flywheels not only because of the required flexibility, but also due to the smoother coupling action of the torque converter and the elimination of the clutch surface.

Like a flywheel, a flexplate normally handles coupling to the starter motor via gear teeth cut along its outer edge. These teeth give the flexplate a gear-like appearance in spite of this being a secondary function.

Flexplates come in many forms, but are usually either stamped steel (for road cars), a machined two-piece billet (for race cars), or a machined one-piece billet (for high-performance drag racers).

== See also ==
- Flywheel
