= Starter (engine) =

Device used to start an internal combustion engine

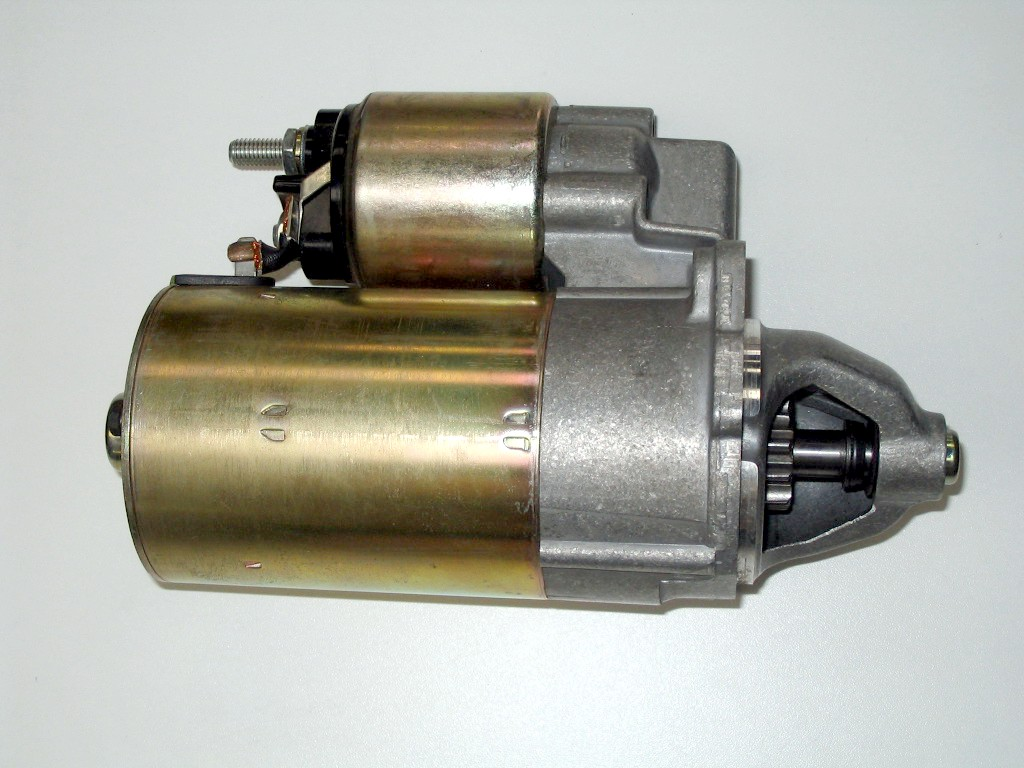
An automobile starter assembly. The larger cylinder is the motor housing, and the smaller cylinder on top is the solenoid which controls power to the motor and engages the drive pinion with the engine's flywheel

A starter (also self-starter, cranking motor, or starter motor) is an apparatus installed in motor vehicles to rotate the crankshaft of an internal combustion engine so as to initiate the engine's combustion cycle. Starters can be electric, pneumatic, or hydraulic. The starter can also be another internal combustion engine in the case, for instance, of very large engines, or diesel engines in agricultural or excavation applications.

Internal combustion engines are feedback systems, which, once started, rely on the inertia from each cycle to initiate the next cycle. In a four-stroke engine, the third stroke releases energy from the fuel, powering the fourth (exhaust) stroke and also the first two (intake, compression) strokes of the next cycle, as well as powering the engine's external load. To start the first cycle at the beginning of any particular session, the first two strokes must be powered in some other way than from the engine itself. The starter motor is used for this purpose and it is not required once the engine starts running and its feedback loop becomes self-sustaining.

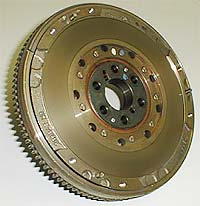
Starter ring gear on its flywheel

== History ==
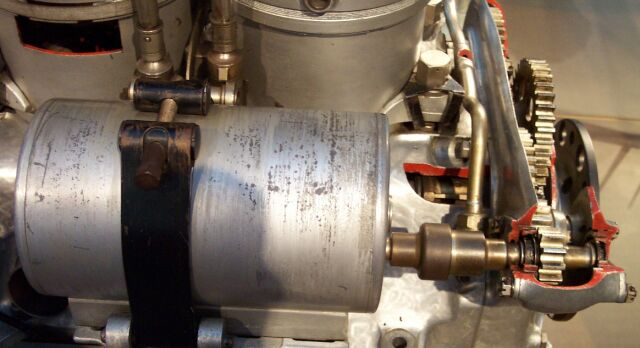
A 1920s era electric self-starter for an airship engine

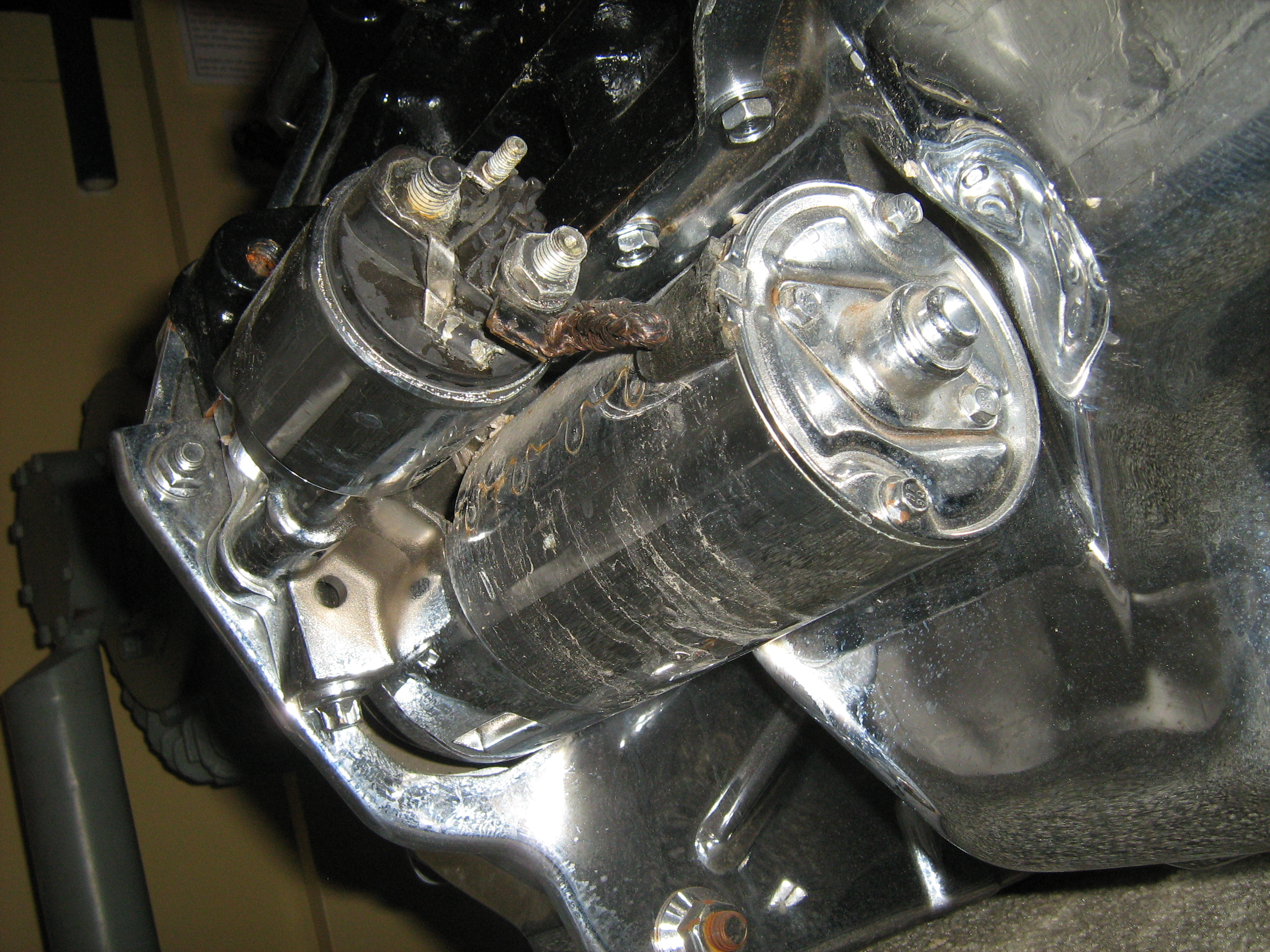
Typical electric starter installed underneath and toward the rear of an automobile engine

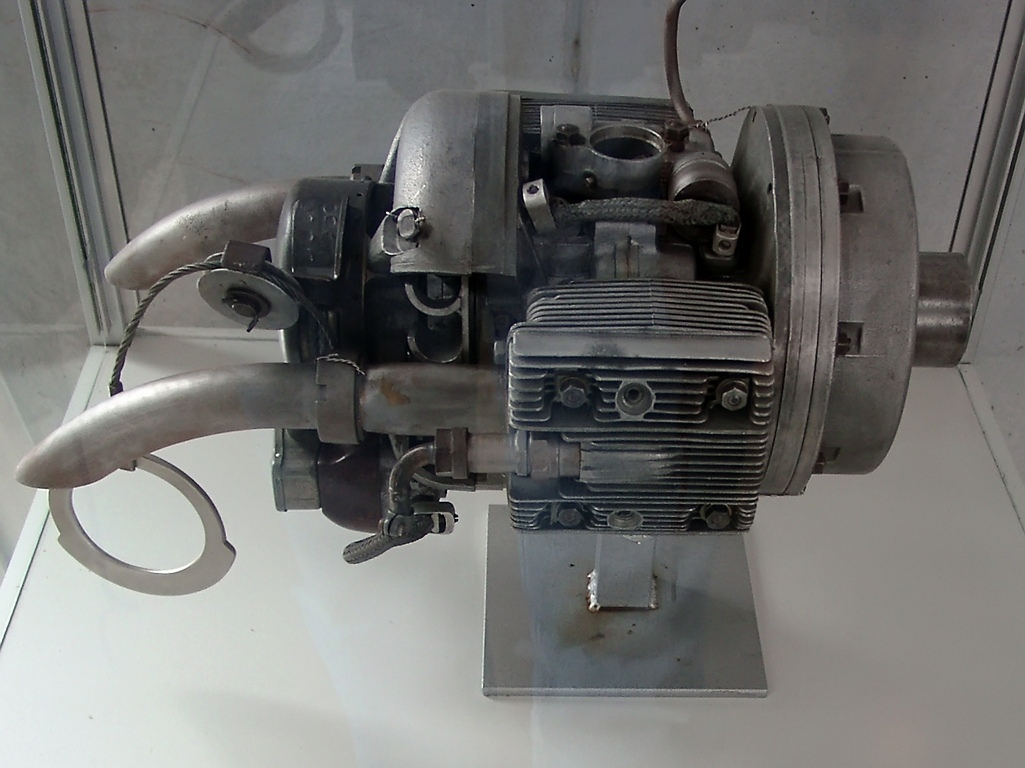
The Norbert Riedel-designed, "APU-style" two-stroke starter motor for a Jumo 004 turbojet engine

Before the advent of the starter motor, engines were started by various methods including wind-up springs, gunpowder cylinders, and human-powered techniques such as a removable crank handle which engaged the front of the crankshaft, pulling on an airplane propeller, or pulling a cord that was wound around an open-face pulley.

The hand-crank method was commonly used to start engines, but it was inconvenient, difficult, and dangerous. The behavior of an engine during starting is not always predictable. The engine can kick back, causing sudden reverse rotation. Many manual starters included a one-directional slip or release provision so that once engine rotation began, the starter would disengage from the engine. In the event of a kickback, the reverse rotation of the engine could suddenly engage the starter, causing the crank to unexpectedly and violently jerk, possibly injuring the operator. For cord-wound starters, a kickback could pull the operator towards the engine or machine, or swing the starter cord and handle at high speed around the starter pulley. Even though cranks had an overrun mechanism, when the engine started, the crank could begin to spin along with the crankshaft and potentially strike the person cranking the engine. Additionally, care had to be taken to retard the spark in order to prevent backfiring; with an advanced spark setting, the engine could kick back (run in reverse), pulling the crank with it, because the overrun safety mechanism works in one direction only.

Although users were advised to cup their fingers and thumb under the crank and pull up, it felt natural for operators to grasp the handle with the fingers on one side, the thumb on the other. Even a simple backfire could result in a broken thumb; it was possible to end up with a broken wrist, a dislocated shoulder or worse. Moreover, increasingly larger engines with higher compression ratios made hand cranking a more physically demanding endeavour.

The first electric starter was installed on an Arnold, an adaptation of the Benz Velo, built in 1896 in East Peckham, England, by electrical engineer H. J. Dowsing.

In 1903, Clyde J. Coleman invented and patented the first electric starter in America U.S. patent 0,745,157.

In 1911, Charles F. Kettering, with Henry M. Leland, of Dayton Engineering Laboratories Company (DELCO), invented and filed U.S. patent 1,150,523 for an electric starter in America. (Kettering had replaced the hand crank on NCR's cash registers with an electric motor five years earlier.)

One aspect of the invention lay in the realization that a relatively small motor, driven with higher voltage and current than would be feasible for continuous operation, could deliver enough power to crank the engine for starting. At the voltage and current levels required, such a motor would burn out in a few minutes of continuous operation, but not during the few seconds needed to start the engine. The starters were first installed on the Cadillac Model Thirty in 1912, with the same system being adopted by Lanchester later that year. These starters also worked as generators once the engine was running, a concept that is now being revived in hybrid vehicles.

Although the electric starter motor was to come to dominate the car market, in 1912, there were several competing types of starter, with the Adams, S.C.A.T. and Wolseley cars having direct air starters, and Sunbeam introducing an air starter motor with similar approach to that used for the Delco and Scott-Crossley electrical starter motors (i.e. engaging with a toothed ring on the flywheel). The Star and Adler cars had spring motors (sometimes referred to as clockwork motors), which used the energy stored in a spring driving through a reduction gear. If the car failed to start, the starter handle could be used to wind up the spring for a further attempt.

One of the innovations on the first Dodge car, the Model 30-35 at its introduction in 1914 was an electric starter and electric lighting with a 12-volt system (against the six volts that was usual at the time) as a standard fitment on what was a relatively low-priced car. The Dodge used a combined starter-generator unit, with a direct current dynamo permanently coupled by gears to the engine's crankshaft. A system of electrical relays allowed this to be driven as a motor to rotate the engine for starting, and once the starter button was released the controlling switchgear returned the unit to operation as a generator. Because the starter-generator was directly coupled to the engine it did not need a method of engaging and disengaging the motor drive. It thus suffered negligible mechanical wear and was virtually silent in operation. The starter-generator remained a feature of Dodge cars until 1929. The disadvantage of the design was that, as a dual-purpose device, the unit was limited in both its power as a motor and its output as a generator, which became a problem as engine size and electrical demands on cars increased. Controlling the switch between motor and generator modes required dedicated and relatively complex switchgear which was more prone to failure than the heavy-duty contacts of a dedicated starter motor. While the starter-generator dropped out of favour for cars by the 1930s, the concept was still useful for smaller vehicles and was taken up by the German firm SIBA Elektrik which built similar system intended mostly for use on motorcycles, scooters, economy cars (especially those with small-capacity two-stroke engines), and marine engines. These were marketed under the 'Dynastart' name. Since motorcycles usually had small engines and limited electrical equipment, as well as restricted space and weight, the Dynastart was a useful feature. The windings for the starter-generator were usually incorporated into the engine's flywheel, thus not requiring a separate unit at all.

The Ford Model T relied on hand cranks until 1919; during the 1920s, electric starters became near-universal on most new cars, making it easier for women and elderly people to drive. It was still common for cars to be supplied with starter handles into the 1960s, and this continued much later for some makes (e.g. Citroën 2CV until end of production in 1990). In many cases, cranks were used for setting timing rather than starting the engine as growing displacements and compression ratios made this impractical. Communist bloc cars such as Ladas often still supported crank-starting as late as the 1980s.

For the first examples of production German turbojet engines later in World War II, Norbert Riedel designed a small two-stroke, opposed-twin gasoline engine to start both the Junkers Jumo 004 and BMW 003 aircraft gas turbines as a form of auxiliary power unit to get the central spindle of each engine design rotating — these were usually installed at the very front of the turbojet, and were themselves started by a pull-rope to get them running during the startup procedure for the jet engines they were fitted to.

Before Chrysler's 1949 innovation of the key-operated combination ignition-starter switch, the starter was often operated by the driver pressing a button mounted on the floor or dashboard. Some vehicles had a pedal in the floor that manually engaged the starter drive pinion with the flywheel ring gear, then completed the electrical circuit to the starter motor once the pedal reached the end of its travel. Ferguson tractors from the 1940s, including the Ferguson TE20, had an extra position on the gear lever that engaged the starter switch, ensuring safety by preventing the tractors from being started in gear.

== Electric ==
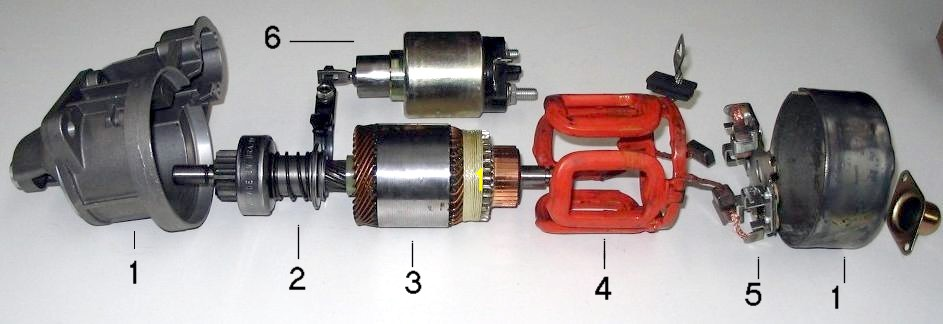
1. Main housing (yoke); 2. Freewheel and pinion gear assembly; 3. Armature; 4. Field coils with brushes attached; 5. Brush-carrier; 6. Solenoid

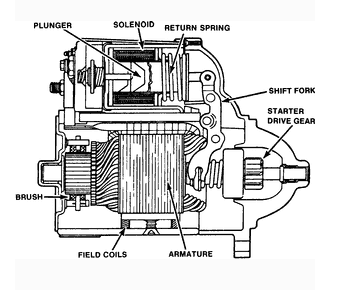
Starter motor diagram

The electric starter motor or cranking motor is the most common type used on gasoline engines and small diesel engines. The modern starter motor is either a permanent-magnet or a series-parallel wound direct current electric motor with a starter solenoid (similar to a relay) mounted on it. When DC power from the starting battery is applied to the solenoid, usually through a key-operated switch (the "ignition switch"), the solenoid engages a lever that pushes out the drive pinion on the starter driveshaft and meshes the pinion with the starter ring gear on the flywheel of the engine.

The solenoid also closes high-current contacts for the starter motor, which begins to turn. Once the engine starts, the key-operated switch is opened, a spring in the solenoid assembly pulls the pinion gear away from the ring gear, and the starter motor stops. The starter's pinion is clutched to its drive shaft through an overrunning sprag clutch which permits the pinion to transmit drive in only one direction. In this manner, drive is transmitted through the pinion to the flywheel ring gear, but if the pinion remains engaged (as for example because the operator fails to release the key as soon as the engine starts, or if there is a short and the solenoid remains engaged), the pinion will spin independently of its drive shaft. This prevents the engine driving the starter, for such backdrive would cause the starter to spin so fast as to fly apart.

The sprag clutch arrangement would preclude the use of the starter as a generator if employed in the hybrid scheme mentioned above, unless modifications were made. The standard starter motor is typically designed for intermittent use, which would preclude its use as a generator. The starter's electrical components are designed only to operate for typically under 30 seconds before overheating (by too-slow dissipation of heat from ohmic losses), to save weight and cost. Most automobile owner manuals instruct the operator to pause for at least ten seconds after each ten or fifteen seconds of cranking the engine, when trying to start an engine that does not start immediately.

This overrunning-clutch pinion arrangement was phased into use beginning in the early 1960s; before that time, a Bendix drive was used. The Bendix system places the starter drive pinion on a helically cut drive shaft. When the starter motor begins turning, the inertia of the drive pinion assembly causes it to ride forward on the helix and thus engage with the ring gear. When the engine starts, backdrive from the ring gear causes the drive pinion to exceed the rotative speed of the starter, at which point the drive pinion is forced back down the helical shaft and thus out of mesh with the ring gear. This has the disadvantage that the gears will disengage if the engine fires briefly but does not continue to run.

Hear a Folo-Thru starter
A starter motor with Bendix Folo-Thru drive cranks a Chrysler Slant-6 engine. The Folo-Thru drive pinion stays engaged through a cylinder firing but not causing the engine to start

=== Folo-Thru drive ===
An intermediate development between the Bendix drive developed in the 1930s and the overrunning-clutch designs introduced in the 1960s was the Bendix Folo-Thru drive. The standard Bendix drive would disengage from the ring gear as soon as the engine fired, even if it did not continue to run. The Folo-Thru drive contains a latching mechanism and a set of flyweights in the body of the drive unit. When the starter motor begins turning and the drive unit is forced forward on the helical shaft by inertia, it is latched into the engaged position. Only once the drive unit is spun at a speed higher than that attained by the starter motor itself (i.e., it is backdriven by the running engine) will the flyweights pull radially outward, releasing the latch and permitting the overdriven drive unit to be spun out of engagement. In this manner, unwanted starter disengagement is avoided before a successful engine start.

=== Gear reduction ===
Hear a gear-reduction starter
A Chrysler gear-reduction starter cranks a V8 engine

In 1962, Chrysler introduced a starter incorporating a geartrain between the motor and the drive shaft. The motor shaft included integrally cut gear teeth forming a pinion that meshes with a larger adjacent driven gear to provide a gear reduction ratio of 3.75:1. This permitted the use of a higher-speed, lower-current, lighter and more compact motor assembly while increasing cranking torque. Variants of this starter design were used on most rear- and four-wheel-drive vehicles produced by Chrysler Corporation from 1962 through 1987. It makes a unique, distinct sound when cranking the engine, which led to it being nicknamed the "Highland Park Hummingbird"—a reference to Chrysler's headquarters in Highland Park, Michigan.

The Chrysler gear-reduction starter formed the conceptual basis for the gear-reduction starters that now predominate in vehicles on the road. Many Japanese automakers phased in gear reduction starters in the 1970s and 1980s. Light aircraft engines also made extensive use of this kind of starter, because its light weight offered an advantage.

Those starters not employing offset gear trains like the Chrysler unit generally employ planetary epicyclic gear trains instead. Direct-drive starters are almost entirely obsolete owing to their larger size, heavier weight and higher current requirements.

=== Movable pole shoe ===
Ford issued a nonstandard starter, a direct-drive "movable pole shoe" design that provided cost reduction rather than electrical or mechanical benefits. This type of starter eliminated the solenoid, replacing it with a movable pole shoe and a separate starter relay. This starter operates as follows: The driver turns the key, activating the starter switch. A small electric current flows through the solenoid actuated starter relay, closing the contacts and sending large battery current to the starter motor. One of the pole shoes, hinged at the front, linked to the starter drive, and spring-loaded away from its normal operating position, is swung into position by the magnetic field created by electricity flowing through its field coil. This moves the starter drive forward to engage the flywheel ring gear, and simultaneously closes a pair of contacts supplying current to the rest of the starter motor winding. Once the engine starts and the driver releases the starter switch, a spring retracts the pole shoe, which pulls the starter drive out of engagement with the ring gear.

This starter was used on Ford vehicles from 1973 through 1990, when a gear-reduction unit conceptually similar to the Chrysler unit replaced it.

=== Inertia starter ===
A variant on the electric starter motor is the inertia starter (not to be confused with the Bendix-type starter described above). Here the starter motor does not turn the engine directly. Instead, when energized, the motor turns a heavy flywheel built into its casing (not the main flywheel of the engine). Once the flywheel/motor unit has reached a constant speed the current to the motor is turned off and the drive between the motor and flywheel is disengaged by a freewheel mechanism. The spinning flywheel is then connected to the main engine and its inertia turns it over to start it. These stages are commonly automated by solenoid switches, with the machine operator using a two-position control switch, which is held in one position to spin the motor and then moved to the other to cut the current to the motor and engage the flywheel to the engine.

The advantage of the inertia starter is that, because the motor is not driving the engine directly, it can be of much lower power than the standard starter for an engine of the same size. This allows for a motor of much lower weight and smaller size, as well as lighter cables and smaller batteries to power the motor. This made the inertia starter a common choice for aircraft with large radial piston engines. The disadvantage is the increased time required to start the engine - spinning up the flywheel to the required speed can take between 10 and 20 seconds. If the engine does not start by the time the flywheel has lost its inertia then the process must be repeated for the next attempt.

== Pneumatic ==
Some gas turbine engines and diesel engines, particularly on trucks, use a pneumatic self-starter. In ground vehicles the system consists of a geared turbine, an air compressor and a pressure tank. Compressed air released from the tank is used to spin the turbine, and through a set of reduction gears, engages the ring gear on the flywheel, much like an electric starter. The engine, once running, drives the compressor to recharge the tank.

Aircraft with large gas turbine engines are typically started using a large volume of low-pressure compressed air, supplied from a very small engine referred to as an auxiliary power unit, located elsewhere in the aircraft. Alternatively, aircraft gas turbine engines can be rapidly started using a mobile ground-based pneumatic starting engine, referred to as a start cart or air start cart.

On larger diesel generators found in large shore installations and especially on ships, a pneumatic starting gear is used. The air motor is normally powered by compressed air at pressures of 10–30 bars (1,000–3,000 kPa). The air motor is made up of a center drum about the size of a soup can with four or more slots cut into it to allow for the vanes to be placed radially on the drum to form chambers around the drum. The drum is offset inside a round casing so that the inlet air for starting is admitted at the area where the drum and vanes form a small chamber compared to the others. The compressed air can only expand by rotating the drum, which allows the small chamber to become larger and puts another one of the cambers in the air inlet. The air motor spins much too fast to be used directly on the flywheel of the engine; instead a large gearing reduction, such as a planetary gear, is used to lower the output speed. A Bendix gear is used to engage the flywheel.

A pair of air-starting motors on a 3300 kW diesel standby generator

Since large trucks typically use air brakes, the system does double duty, supplying compressed air to the brake system. Pneumatic starters have the advantages of delivering high torque, mechanical simplicity and reliability. They eliminate the need for oversized, heavy storage batteries in prime mover electrical systems.

Large Diesel generators and almost all Diesel engines used as the prime mover of ships use compressed air acting directly on the cylinder head. This is not ideal for smaller Diesels, as it provides too much cooling on starting. Also, the cylinder head needs to have enough space to support an extra valve for the air start system. The air start system is conceptually very similar to a distributor in a car. There is an air distributor that is geared to the camshaft of the Diesel engine; on the top of the air distributor is a single lobe similar to what is found on a camshaft. Arranged radially around this lobe are roller tip followers for every cylinder. When the lobe of the air distributor hits one of the followers it will send an air signal that acts upon the back of the air start valve located in the cylinder head, causing it to open. Compressed air is provided from a large reservoir that feeds into a header located along the engine. As soon as the air start valve is opened, the compressed air is admitted and the engine will begin turning. It can be used on two-cycle and four-cycle engines and on reversing engines. On large two-stroke engines less than one revolution of the crankshaft is needed for starting.

== Hydraulic ==
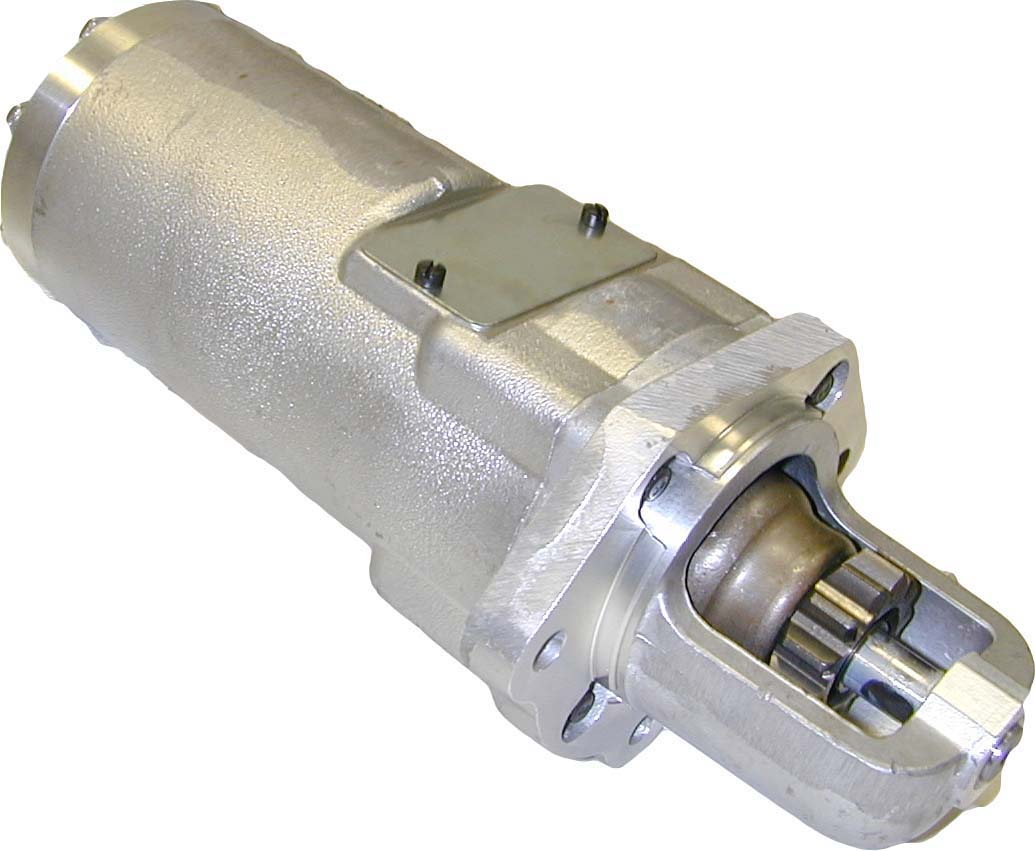
Hydraulic Starter

Some diesel engines from six to 16 cylinders are started by means of a hydraulic motor. Hydraulic starters and the associated systems provide a sparkless, reliable method of engine starting over a wide temperature range. Typically hydraulic starters are found in applications such as remote generators, lifeboat propulsion engines, offshore fire pumping engines, and hydraulic fracturing rigs. The system used to support the hydraulic starter includes valves, pumps, filters, a reservoir, and piston accumulators. The operator can manually recharge the hydraulic system; this cannot readily be done with electric starting systems, so hydraulic starting systems are favored in applications wherein emergency starting is a requirement.

With various configurations, Hydraulic starters can be fitted on any engine. Hydraulic starters employ the high efficiency of the axial piston motor concept, which provides high torque at any temperature or environment, and guarantees minimal wear of the engine ring gear and the pinion.

== Non-motor ==
=== Spring starter ===
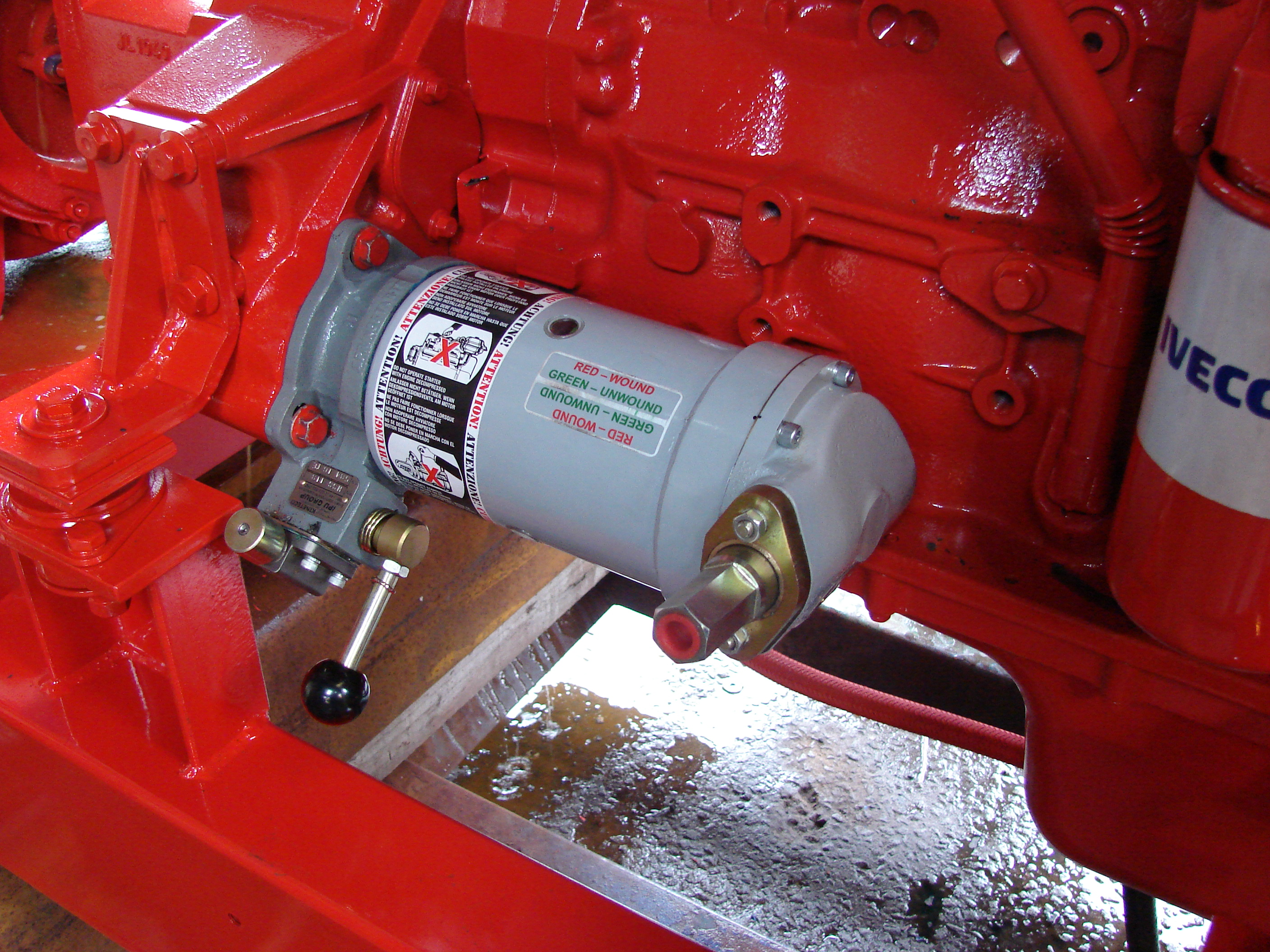
Modern spring starter

A spring starter uses potential energy stored in a spring wound up with a crank to start an engine without a battery or alternator. Turning the crank moves the pinion into mesh with the engine's ring gear, then winds up the spring. Pulling the release lever then applies the spring tension to the pinion, turning the ring gear to start the engine. The pinion automatically disengages from the flywheel after operation. Provision is also made to allow the engine to be slowly turned over by hand for engine maintenance. This is achieved by operating the trip lever just after the pinion has engaged with the flywheel. Subsequent turning of the winding handle during this operation will not load the starter. Spring starters can be found in engine-generators and hydraulic power packs, and on lifeboat engines, with the most common application being backup starting system on seagoing vessels. A version of this kind of starter called an impulse or wind-up starter was used on small engines, as used on lawn mowers and other outdoor power equipment, from the 1950s to the early 1970s, when they were taken off the market over safety concerns.

=== Fuel-starting ===
Some modern gasoline engines with twelve or more cylinders always have at least one or more pistons at the beginning of its power stroke and are able to start by injecting fuel into that cylinder and igniting it. The same procedure can be applied to engines with fewer cylinders, if the engine happens to be stopped at the correct position. This is one way of starting an engine of a car with a stop-start system.

== See also ==
- Aircraft engine starter
- Coffman starter
- Flame-start system
- Hucks starter
- Hybrid Synergy Drive
- List of auto parts
- Vincent Hugo Bendix
