= Backdrive =

A backdrive is a component used in reverse to obtain its input from its output. This extends to many concepts and systems from thought based to practical mechanical applications.

Not every system can be backdriven. A DC electrical generator can be implemented by backdriving a DC electric motor, however a worm drive works only in one direction.

Example: A CNC vertical mill has a vertical lead screw on the Z-axis. A low lead screw pitch (i.e. 5 turns per inch or fewer) means when the driving motor power is removed such as by turning the machine off, the weight of the spindle will cause the lead screw to rotate as the spindle motor falls down. The solution to prevent back-driving is to use a finer (higher) lead screw pitch (i.e. 10tpi or greater) or have a locking mechanism.

Another example is the practice to add swivel caster wheels on a mobile robot, so that humans can push away the robot when it comes too close.

A dynamic loudspeaker or headphone driver can also be used as a rudimentary microphone.
