= Vacuum delay valve =

A vacuum delay valve is a valve with a small orifice, which delays a vacuum signal. These are commonly used in automobiles to alter the behavior of vacuum switches, vacuum motors, and other vacuum devices.

The engine in a common automobile produces almost 20 inches of mercury (68 kPa) of vacuum, and this pressure differential has been utilized for everything from automatic locks and windshield wipers to operating emissions control items.

Engine vacuum is also the best direct source of information on the engine's load.

Most delay valves have a one-way function, where there is either no restriction or no movement in one direction.

Delay valves are usually color-coded to their function.

| Color Code | | Time (seconds) | Threshold (+/- seconds) | Direction |
|---|---|---|---|---|
| Orange | Black | 2 | 0.5 | Forward |
| Purple | Black | 4 | 0.8 | Forward |
| Gray | Black | 10 | 2 | Forward |
| Brown | Black | 20 | 4 | Forward |
| White | Black | 63.5 | 13.5 | Forward |
| Yellow | Black | 100 | 20 | Forward |
| Green | Black | 200 | 40 | Forward |
| Orange | White | 2 | 0.5 | Reverse |
| Purple | White | 4 | 0.8 | Reverse |
| Gray | White | 10 | 2 | Reverse |
| Gold | White | 15 | 3 | Reverse |
| Brown | White | 20 | 4 | Reverse |
| Yellow | White | 100 | 20 | Reverse |
| Red | White | 375 | 75 | Reverse |
