= Automobile accessory power =

Power in cars

Example energy flows for a late-model midsize passenger car: (a) urban driving; (b) highway driving. Source: U.S. Department of Energy

Automobile accessory power can be transferred by several different means. However, it is always ultimately derived from the automobile's internal combustion engine, battery, or other "prime mover" source of energy. The advent of high-powered batteries in hybrid and all-electrical vehicles is shifting the balance of technologies even further in the direction of electrically powered accessories.

An engine has one or more devices for converting energy it produces into a usable form, electricity connection through the alternator, hydraulic connections from a pump or engine system, compressed air, and engine vacuum; or the engine may be directly tapped through a mechanical connection. Modern vehicles run most accessories on electrical power. Typically, only 2% of a vehicle's total power output has gone towards powering accessories. Electrical and hybrid vehicles may use a larger proportion of energy for accessories, due to reduced inefficiencies in the drive train, especially the elimination of engine idling.

== Mechanical ==
Some automobile accessories are connected directly to the engine through gears or belts. These usually require large amounts of power. The air conditioning compressor has been a familiar example, though new all-electric refrigerant compressors are starting to be used in production vehicles.

== Electrical ==
Early automobiles used a magneto for ignition, which provided no accessory power.

The first electrical accessory connection was supplied by a DC generator. Voltage varied with engine speed and because of technological limitations, complicated mechanical devices were used to regulate it. Even so, voltage at idle was too low to be useful. A lead-acid battery was used to provide proper voltage when the generator could not, and was recharged at higher engine speed or lower electrical load. The automobile self starter was an early engine system to use this.

Lighting, which had previously been provided by kerosene lamps or gas lamps, was one of the first common electrical accessories.

Early systems used 6 volts, but 12 volts became the standard because it provided greater power with less current. The original DC generator was replaced by an alternator controlled by a voltage regulator. Due to mechanical and electrical properties, it is more efficient to first produce alternating current and then immediately convert it to direct current. By regulating the current sent to the alternator's rotor and thus the strength of the magnetic field, a stable voltage can be produced over a wider range of engine speeds.

Starting, lighting and ignition systems of most gasoline-powered vehicles remain as 12 volt systems. Diesel-powered vehicles, including mobile construction equipment and heavy trucks use 24 volt electrical systems, as do many military vehicles. Research is ongoing into adopting a 42-volt electrical system standard for automotive electricity, but the entire electrical system will have to be redesigned and new components manufactured to work with the higher voltage. The main advantage of higher voltage is that electrical components can be made with less metal, saving weight and cost, and improving energy efficiency. As such an 48-volt electrical system has been introduced.

Most modern systems, such as power windows, power seats, and power door locks, are electrically powered. Electrically driven power steering systems have been developed and are used in numerous models. High-efficiency all-electric refrigerant compressors for air conditioning are starting to be used, especially in hybrid or all-electric vehicles.

The cigarette lighter receptacle serves as a de facto standard for use of portable 12 volt equipment in or near an automobile, it is sometimes used with car charger to power devices with batteries. Anderson plug for high amperage.

== Hydraulic ==
The engine generally has a hydraulic pump mechanically driven by the engine, but there may also be electrically driven pumps.

In passenger cars, the most common use of hydraulic power has been the steering system. Convertible tops may be raised and lowered using hydraulics. Windshield wipers were sometimes hydraulically driven, although this use mostly ceased after the late 1960s. On vehicles with little or no engine vacuum, hydraulic systems are generally adopted in place of vacuum systems.

The French company Citroën devised a high-pressure hydraulics system for cars which was used for all manner of systems, even power-adjustable seats.

The 1999–2004 Jeep Grand Cherokee had a hydraulically driven radiator fan, powered by the SUV's power steering pump.

In vehicles such as heavy trucks and tractors, hydraulic systems are much more common. Hydraulic rams are used for accessories such as dump truck beds, cranes, loaders, and three-point hitches.

== Vacuum ==
A commonly available source of power from an internal combustion engine is the partial vacuum available at the intake manifold. The piston engine is fundamentally an air pump, and it produces suction and partial manifold vacuum.

Manifold vacuum varies depending on engine load and throttle position, and automobiles use vacuum reservoirs or "vacuum canisters" to provide a usable source under varying conditions. Turbo charged and super charged engines do not always produce vacuum; the intake manifold is actually pressurized when the turbo is spinning above a certain speed.

Reservoirs and devices connected to the engine through check valves allow pressure to reduce when the engine is generating a lot of vacuum, but do not allow air back in. Vacuum canisters only allow vacuum accessories to be operated for a very short time, and air will leak in after the engine turns off.

The most ubiquitous vacuum-powered accessory is the booster for the power brake system. The vacuum is only an assist and the brakes can still function, requiring greater force, if the booster vacuum is used up.

Many older vehicles used vacuum-powered windshield wipers. Loss of manifold vacuum when the engine was working hard, or at wide open throttle, necessitated using a vacuum booster pump which was usually part of the fuel pump.

Automotive vacuum systems reached their height of use between the 1960s and 1980s. During this time a huge variety of vacuum switches, delay valves and accessory devices were created.

As an example, a 1967 Ford Thunderbird used vacuum for:

- Power brakes
- Transmission shift control
- Doors for the hidden headlamps
- Remote trunk latch release
- Rear cabin vent control
- Power door locks
- Ventilation air routing
- Control of the heater core valve
- Tilt-away steering wheel release

Such systems tend to be unreliable with age as the vacuum tubing becomes brittle and susceptible to leaks.

== Pneumatic ==
Pneumatic (compressed air) systems are rarely found in passenger cars. Larger vehicles often use air brakes and the pressure may be used to drive other systems. Windshield wipers, automatic gear boxes, and other common hydraulic or vacuum powered accessories are often adapted. On buses where the engine is often at the rear of the vehicle, compressed air may be used for the throttle and clutch.

Bus doors are typically air powered, as well as the steps and the suspension, allowing the bus to lower itself or "kneel" at stops to allow passengers on or off.

Central tire inflation system, differential lock, air suspension and to power pneumatic tools.
