= Windshield washer fluid =

Fluid for cleaning windshields on automobiles

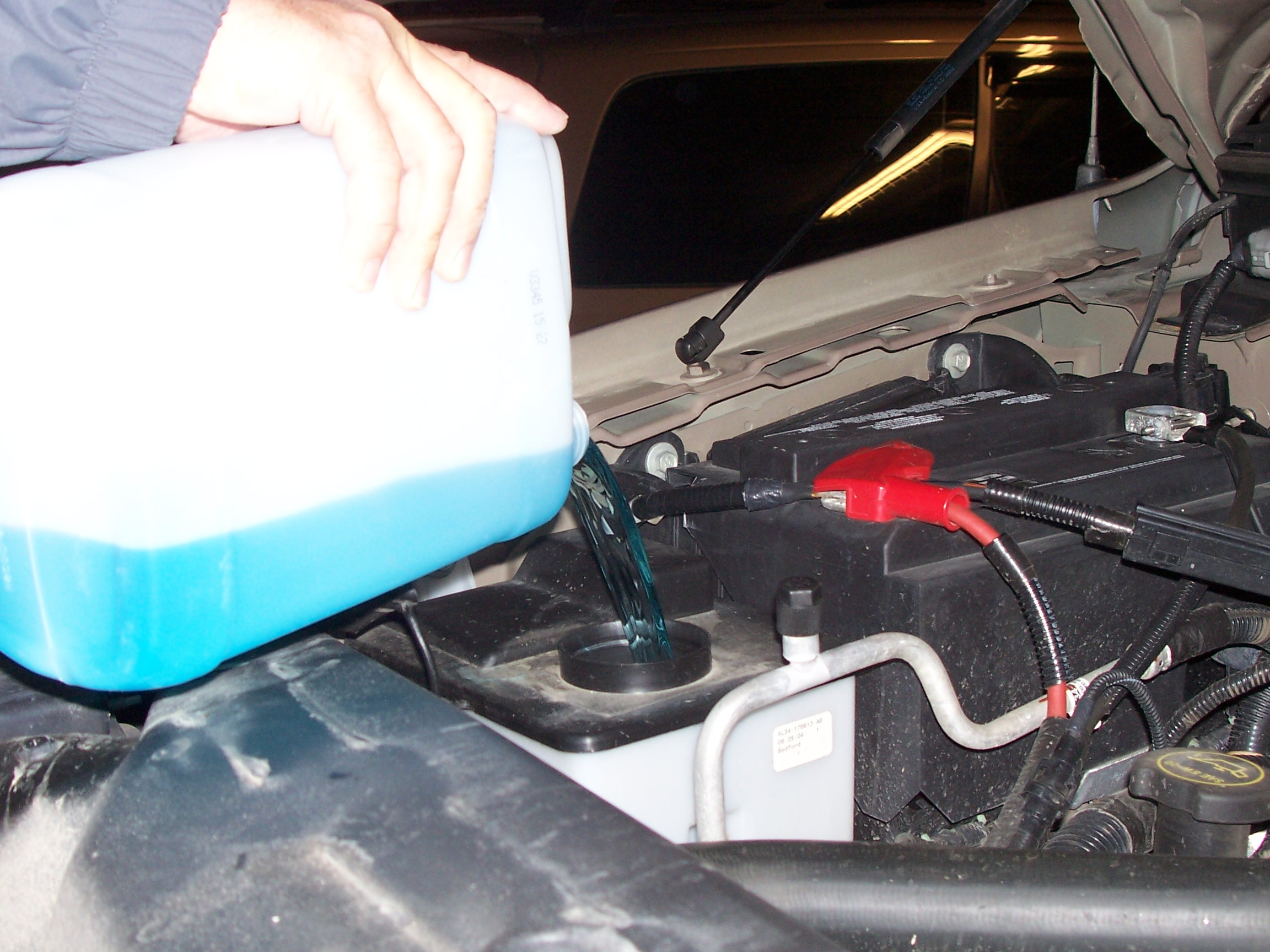
Windshield washer fluid being poured into a vehicle's storage tank, or reservoir

Windshield washer fluid (also called windshield wiper fluid, wiper fluid, screen wash (in the UK), or washer fluid) is a fluid for motor vehicles that is used in cleaning the windshield with the windshield wiper while the vehicle is being driven.

== Delivery system ==
A control within the car can be operated to spray washer fluid onto the windshield, typically using an electrical pump via jets mounted either beneath the windshield or beneath the wiper blade(s). The windshield wipers are automatically turned on, cleaning dirt and debris off the windshield. Some vehicles use the same method to clean the rear window or the headlights. The first windshield cleaner unit offered for automobiles was in 1936, as an aftermarket option to be installed on cars after they were bought. In 1946, General Motors installed windshield washers on all their vehicles as an extra cost option, while Chrysler offered the feature optionally in 1950 and Ford offered them in 1952.

Washer fluid may sometimes be preheated before being delivered onto the windshield. This is especially desirable in colder climates when a thin layer of ice or frost accumulates on the windshield's surface, as it eliminates the need to manually scrape the windshield or pour warm water on the glass. Although there are a few aftermarket preheat devices available, many automobile makers offer this feature factory installed on at least some of their vehicles. For example, General Motors had begun equipping vehicles with heated washer fluid systems from the factory beginning in 2006 with the Buick Lucerne sedan. The system emits a fine mist of heated water that clears frost without damaging the windshield itself. GM also claims heated washer fluid helps in removing bug splatters and other road accumulation. The company halted the production of these mechanisms after they found that it was prone to starting engine fires. Mercedes-Benz has used a thermostatically controlled heating element, with the engine coolant as the heat source, since the mid-1980s on certain models. Many other manufacturers have employed electrically heated washer nozzles primarily to prevent them from freezing closed, not in an attempt to heat the fluid itself.

== Varieties ==
Windshield washer fluid is sold in many formulations, some are pre-mixed and others require dilution before use. Common washer fluid solutions are given labels such as "All-Season", "Bug Remover", or "De-icer".

Typical formulations include a surfactant, water softener, and an antifreeze (but not glycol based as in coolants). Alkyl sulfates and fatty alcohol ethers are typical surfactants.

Dilution factors will vary depending on season, for example in winter, the dilution factor may be 1:1, whereas during summer the dilution factor may be 1:10. It is sometimes sold as sachet of crystals, which is also diluted with water. Distilled or deionised water is the preferred diluent, since it will not leave trace mineral deposits on the glass.

Antifreeze may be added to a mixture to give the product a lower freezing temperature. Antifreezes in screenwash are typically ethanol based, but not ethylene glycol.

Many cars display a warning when the fluid level is low, and some car makers have replaced the float sensor generating this signal with a simple two-pin probe in the tank. This requires a (slightly) conductive fluid, which most common windshield washer fluid mixtures are.

== Concerns ==
Consumer advocacy groups and auto enthusiasts believe that the solvents present in some windshield washer fluid can damage the vehicle. Critics point to the corrosive effects of ethanol, methanol, and other components on paint, rubber, car wax, and plastics, and groups propose various alternatives and homemade recipes to protect the finish and mechanics of the motor vehicle.

== See also ==
- Antifreeze
