= Vacuum switch =

Prior to effective engine control unit computers, vacuum switches were employed to regulate the flow of engine vacuums in automobiles.

For instance, a dual port vacuum switch located in a port on the intake manifold would monitor the coolant temperature in the coolant crossover. It received vacuum (port E on the switch) from the carburetor. The vacuum flowed through the switch to a vacuum solenoid such as a heat riser used to restrict exhaust, allowing the engine to heat up faster. When the coolant heated to operating temperature, the vacuum switch closed off the port (port S), turning off the vacuum to the heat riser. The result clears the exhaust restriction. The switch monitored the temperature, and performed its designed function under optimal conditions.

== See also ==
- Automobile accessory power
- Manifold vacuum
