= Power door locks =

Security feature of a motor vehicle

Animation of how a power lock system works (simple relay operation)

Power door locks (also known as electric door locks or central locking) allow the driver or front passenger to simultaneously lock or unlock all the doors of an automobile or truck, by pressing a button or flipping a switch.

Power door locks were introduced on the luxury Scripps-Booth in 1914, but were not common on luxury cars until Packard reintroduced them in 1956. Nearly every car model today offers this feature as at least optional equipment.

Early systems locked and unlocked only the car doors. Many cars today also feature systems which can unlock such things as the luggage compartment or fuel filler cap door. It is also common on modern cars for the locks to activate automatically when the car is put into gear or reaches a certain speed.

== Remote and handsfree ==
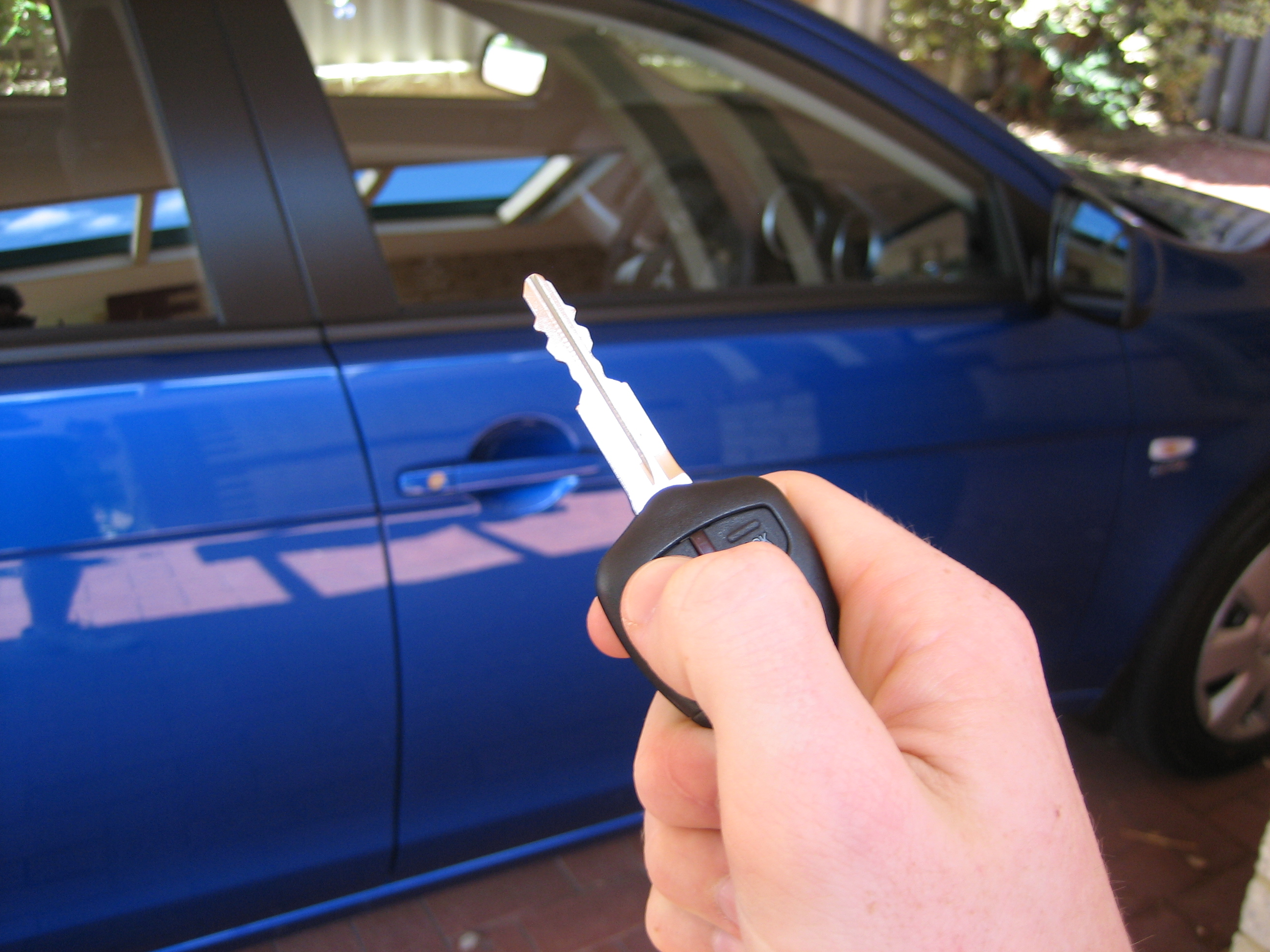
Pressing a button on the key unlocks all of the car doors. Another button locks the car.

In 1980, Ford Motor Company introduced an external keypad-type keyless entry system, wherein the driver entered a numeric combination —either pre-programmed at the factory or one programmed by the owner— to unlock the car without the key. Early- to mid-1980s Nissan Maximas could also be installed with a keypad, which would also retract the windows and moonroof once the car was successfully unlocked by pushing a specific button on the keypad. During the 1990s the Subaru Legacy could also be opened by pulling the drivers external door handle a specific number of times to enter a passcode number that would unlock the driver's door only.

Today, many cars with power door locks also have a radio frequency remote keyless system, which allows a person to press a button on a remote control key fob, the first being available on the French made Renault Fuego in 1982. Currently, many luxury makers also allow the windows to be opened or closed by pressing and holding a button on the remote control key fob, or by inserting the ignition key and holding it in the lock or unlock position in the external driver's door lock.

The remote locking system confirms successful locking and unlocking through either a light or a horn signal, and usually offers an option to switch easily between these two variants. Both provide almost the same functionality, though light signals are more discreet while horn signals might create a nuisance in residential neighborhoods and other busy parking areas (e.g. short-term parking lots). Some manufacturers offer the ability to adjust the horn signal volume.

Other cars have a proximity system that is triggered if a keylike transducer (Advanced Key or handsfree) is within a certain distance of the car.

== See also ==
- Automobile accessory power
- Child safety lock
- List of auto parts
- Power window
