= Vapor lock =

Liquid fuel prematurely gasifying

Vapor lock is a problem caused by liquid fuel changing state to vapor while still in the fuel delivery system of gasoline-fueled internal combustion engines. This disrupts the operation of the fuel pump, causing loss of feed pressure to the carburetor or fuel injection system, resulting in transient loss of power or complete stalling. Restarting the engine from this state may be difficult.

The fuel can vaporize due to being heated by the engine, by the local climate or due to a lower boiling point at high altitude. In regions where fuels with lower viscosity (and lower boiling threshold) are used during the winter to improve engine startup, continued use of the specialized fuels during the summer can cause vapor lock to occur more readily.

== Causes and incidence ==
Vapor lock was far more common in older gasoline-fuel systems incorporating a low-pressure mechanical fuel pump driven by the engine, located in the engine compartment and feeding a carburetor. Such pumps were typically located higher than the fuel tank, were directly heated by the engine and fed fuel directly to the float bowl inside the carburetor. Fuel was drawn under negative pressure (gauge pressure) from the feed line, increasing the risk of a vapor lock developing between the tank and pump. A vapor lock being drawn into the fuel pump could disrupt the fuel pressure long enough for the float chamber in the carburetor to partially or completely drain, causing fuel starvation in the engine. Even temporary disruption of fuel supply into the float chamber is not ideal; most carburetors are designed to run at a fixed level of fuel in the float bowl and reducing the level will reduce the fuel to air mixture delivered to the engine.

Carburetor units may not effectively deal with fuel vapor being delivered to the float chamber. Most designs incorporate a pressure-balance duct linking the top of the float bowl with either the intake to the carburetor or the outside air. Even if the pump can handle vapor locks effectively, fuel vapor entering the float bowl has to be vented. If this is done via the intake system, the mixture is, in effect, enriched, creating a mixture-control and pollution issue. If it is done by venting to the outside, the result is direct hydrocarbon emission and an effective loss of fuel efficiency and possibly a fuel-odor problem. For this reason, some fuel-delivery systems allow fuel vapor to be returned to the fuel tank to be condensed back to the liquid phase, or use an active carbon filled canister where fuel vapor is absorbed. This is usually implemented by removing fuel vapor from the fuel line near the engine rather than from the float bowl. Such a system may also divert excess fuel pressure from the pump back to the tank.

Most modern engines are equipped with fuel injection and have an electric submersible fuel pump in the fuel tank. Moving the fuel pump to the interior of the tank helps prevent vapor lock since the entire fuel-delivery system is under positive pressure and the fuel pump runs cooler than it would be if it is located in the engine compartment. This is the primary reason that vapor lock is rare in modern fuel systems. For the same reason, some carbureted engines are retrofitted with an electric fuel pump near the fuel tank.

A vapor lock is more likely to develop when the vehicle is in traffic because the under-hood temperature tends to rise. A vapor lock can also develop when the engine is stopped while hot and the vehicle is parked for a short period. The fuel in the line near the engine does not move and can thus heat up sufficiently to form a vapor lock. The problem is more likely in hot weather or high altitude in either case.

Gravity-feed fuel systems are not immune to vapor lock. Much of the foregoing applies equally to a gravity-feed system. If vapor forms in the fuel line, its lower density reduces the pressure developed by the weight of the fuel. This pressure is what normally moves fuel from the tank to the carburetor, so fuel supply will be disrupted until the vapor is removed, either by the remaining fuel pressure forcing it into the float bowl and out the vent or by allowing the vapor to cool and re-condense.

Vapor lock has been the cause of forced landings in aircraft. That is why aviation fuel is manufactured to far lower vapor pressure than automotive gasoline (petrol). In addition, aircraft are far more susceptible because of their ability to change altitude and associated ambient pressure rapidly. Liquids boil at lower temperatures when in lower pressure environments.

== Motorsports ==
Vapor lock was a common occurrence in stock car racing, since the cars have traditionally used gasoline and carburetors. With the introduction of the fuel injection requirement for NASCAR-sanctioned events in 2012, vapor lock has been largely eliminated.

Vapor lock is also less common in other motorsports, such as Formula One and IndyCar racing, due to the use of fuel injection and alcohol fuels (ethanol or methanol), which have a lower vapor pressure than gasoline. However, it is not entirely unlikely to happen, as the double Red Bull Racing retirements at the 2022 Bahrain Grand Prix were caused by vapor lock, presumably due to the unusually high temperatures in the fuel system.

== Incidence with other fuels ==
The higher the volatility of the fuel, the more likely it is that vapor lock will occur. Historically, gasoline was a more volatile distillate than it is now and was more prone to vapor lock. Conversely, diesel fuel is far less volatile than gasoline, so that diesel engines almost never suffer from vapor lock. However, diesel engine fuel systems are far more susceptible to air locks in their fuel lines, because standard diesel fuel injection pumps rely on the fuel being non-compressible. Air locks are caused by air leaking into the fuel delivery line or entering from the tank; common causes include the fuel tank being allowed to run dry, changing a fuel filter, or leaky fuel lines. Air locks are eliminated by turning the engine over for a time using the starter motor, or by bleeding the fuel system.

Modern diesel injection systems have self-bleeding electric pumps which eliminate the air lock problem.

== See also ==
- Flooded engine, a different fuel-related issue with similar symptoms
- Air lock, a restriction in a fluid pipe caused by air
