= Wide open throttle =

Engine intake valve fully open

Wide open throttle or wide-open throttle (WOT), also called full throttle, is the fully opened state of a throttle on an engine (internal combustion engine or steam engine). In an internal combustion engine, this state entails the maximum intake of air and fuel that occurs when the throttle plates inside the carburetor or throttle body are "wide open" (fully opened up), providing the least resistance to the incoming air. In the case of an automobile, WOT is when the accelerator is depressed fully, sometimes referred to as "flooring it" (because automotive throttle controls are usually a pedal, so full throttle is selected by pressing the pedal to the floor, or as near as it will go). A throttle on a steam engine controls how much steam is sent to the cylinders from the boiler.

In the case of a diesel engine, which does not have a throttle valve, WOT is the point at which the maximum amount of fuel is being injected relative to the amount of air pumped by the engine, generally in order to bring the fuel-air mixture up to the stoichiometric point. If any more fuel were to be injected then black smoke would result. (Regardless of the non-literal nature of the term when applied to diesel contexts, it is nonetheless figuratively common and well understood.)

At wide open throttle, manifold vacuum decreases. The higher manifold pressure in turn allows more air to enter the combustion cylinders, and thus additional fuel is required to balance the combustion reaction. (Carburetors and fuel injection systems are arranged so as to provide the correct air–fuel ratio as conditions dynamically shift.) The additional air and fuel reacting together produce more power.

Throttle position is a data point in electronic engine control and in on-board diagnostics (OBD). In the many generations and designs of engine control units, a throttle position sensor (TPS) is typically one of the sensors providing input to the computer. Often an air–fuel ratio meter is also used.

In both control theory (involving humans and machines) and control logic (as a machine-based application thereof), the concept of wide open throttle can be divided logically into operator intent, throttle position itself, the resultant/net effect on the state of engine running at each moment, and the feedback loops among those factors. This is true even in a system without electronic control, as, for example, when the operator holds the throttle open (pedal floored) to overcome flooding in a carbureted engine. The intent of WOT in that case is not to rev up the engine (which is not even running yet) but simply to lean out the air–fuel ratio enough to get the engine started. In electronic control, the feedback between the factors can be finessed and exploited in countless ways, even to the extent that in drive by wire systems the operator's input (which is pedal position) is a completely separate concern from throttle position itself, and the computer constantly makes new decisions about how the two should be correlated when the state of engine running changes from second to second. In the carburetion era, carbs had jets and fuel circuits arranged with a certain logic to overcome the transient differences between throttle position changes and their resultant effects on the engine's running (for example, jets to prevent hesitation).

== See also ==
- balls to the wall, a similar concept with probable origins in aircraft throttle control levers
- balls-out, a similar concept with probable origins in ball-style governors on steam engines and gas engines
