= List of carburetor manufacturers =

A carburetor (American English) or carburettor (British English) is a device that mixes air and fuel for internal combustion engines in a suitable air–fuel ratio for combustion.

== List ==
- AMAL, producer of carburetors and hand controls for British motorcycles and light industrial engines.
- Autolite, a division of the Ford Motor Company from 1967 to 1973, and from 1974 to 1985 manufactured by Motorcraft (also a division of Ford Motor Company).
- Bendix Stromberg and Bendix Technico carburetors were used on aircraft and used on vehicles manufactured by Chrysler, International Harvester, Ford, GM, AMC, and Studebaker.
- Bing, Germany (Fritz Hintermayr GmbH Bing-Vergaser-Fabrik).
- Carter, used on numerous makes of vehicles, including those made by Chrysler, IHC, Ford, GM, AMC, and Studebaker, as well as on industrial and agricultural equipment and small engines.
- Claudel-Hobson, UK.
- Dell'Orto carburetors from Italy, used on cars and motorcycles.
- Edelbrock performance carburetors.
- Hitachi, found on Japanese vehicles.
- Holley, with usage as broad as Carter and Weber.
- Jikov, Czechoslovak, used in Škoda cars.
- Keihin, a keiretsu group company affiliated with Honda.
- Mikuni, common on Japanese motorcycles, especially in the 1980s. Mikuni also made racing carburetors for Japanese, British and European cars. Original equipment on Mitsubishi engines.
- Reece Fish, in Volkswagen, Austin Mini, Morris Mini.
- Rochester Products, a General Motors subsidiary; also sold Weber/Magneti Marelli carburetors under license).
- Solex – French carburetors, owned by Weber.
- Société du carburateur Zénith, commonly found in French-designed vehicles; used both in automobiles and aviation.
- SU Carburettors, widely used on British Commonwealth and European-designed vehicles.
- Villiers, used on UK motorcycles and small engines.
- Walbro and Tillotson carburetors for small engines.
- Weber carburetor, Italian, now made in Spain, owned by Magneti Marelli.
- Wheeler–Schebler Carburetor Company.
- Zama Group, primarily an OEM provider.
- Zenith Carburetor Company, American subsidiary of Société du carburateur Zénith.
- Zenith Carburettor Company (British), used on Austin cars. Also produced the Zenith-Stromberg carburetors. Subsidiary of Société du carburateur Zénith.
