= Flooded engine =

Combustion engine with a rich air-fuel mixture

A flooded engine is an internal combustion engine that has been fed an excessively rich air–fuel mixture that cannot be ignited. This is caused by the mixture exceeding the upper explosive limit for the particular fuel. An engine in this condition will not start until the excessively rich mixture has been cleared. It is also possible for an engine to stall from a running state due to this condition.

== Condition ==
Engine flooding was a common problem with carbureted cars, but newer fuel-injected ones are immune to the problem when operating within normal tolerances. Flooding usually occurs during starting, especially under cold conditions or because the accelerator has been pumped. It can also occur during hot starting; high temperatures may cause fuel in the carburetor float chamber to evaporate into the inlet manifold, causing the air/fuel mixture to exceed the upper explosive limit. High temperature fuel may also result in a vapor lock, which is unrelated to flooding but has a similar symptom. Flooding can also occur if the choke has been over applied or has malfunctioned.

A severe form of engine flooding occurs when excessive liquid fuel enters the combustion chamber. This reduces the dead volume of the combustion chamber and thus places a heavy load on the starter motor, such that it fails to turn the engine. Damage (due to excessive compression and even dilution of the lubricating oil with fuel) can also occur. This condition is known as the engine "flooding out." Possible causes of too much liquid fuel in the engine include a defective carburetor float that is not closing the fuel inlet needle valve, or debris caught in the needle valve preventing it from sealing.

Liquids inside an internal combustion engine are extremely detrimental because of the low compressibility of liquids. Although not the most common cause, a severely flooded engine could result in a hydrolock. A hydrolock occurs when a liquid fills a combustion chamber to the point that it is impossible to turn the crankshaft without a catastrophic failure of the engine or one of its vital components.

The conventional remedy for a flooded carbureted engine is to steadily hold the throttle full open (full power position) while continuing to crank the engine. This permits the maximum flow of air through the engine, flushing the overly rich fuel mixture out of the exhaust. If the exhaust system is hot enough to autoignite, an after-fire may result; this can be seen as a flame discharging through the exhaust system. On a fuel-injected engine, ignoring the throttle (no fuel) while starting permits electronic logic systems to produce the correct fuel mixture, often based on exhaust gases. Some fuel injection computers interpret "pumping" the throttle to indicate a flooded engine, and alter the fuel-air mixture accordingly. In a carbureted engine equipped with an accelerator pump (which advances fuel flow to match air ingestion under rapid throttle acceleration), "pumping" the throttle will force excess fuel into the engine, further flooding it.

In worst cases, the excess fuel can foul spark plugs, sometimes necessitating their cleaning or replacement before the engine will start. This is most likely to occur on a carbureted engine in cold weather, after a running engine has been shut off briefly before being restarted. Doing so can cause the choke valve to configure the mixture for a cold engine start, despite higher actual temperatures, resulting in an overly rich mixture and flooded engine.

== See also ==
- Vapor lock
