= Throttle position sensor =

Sensor device

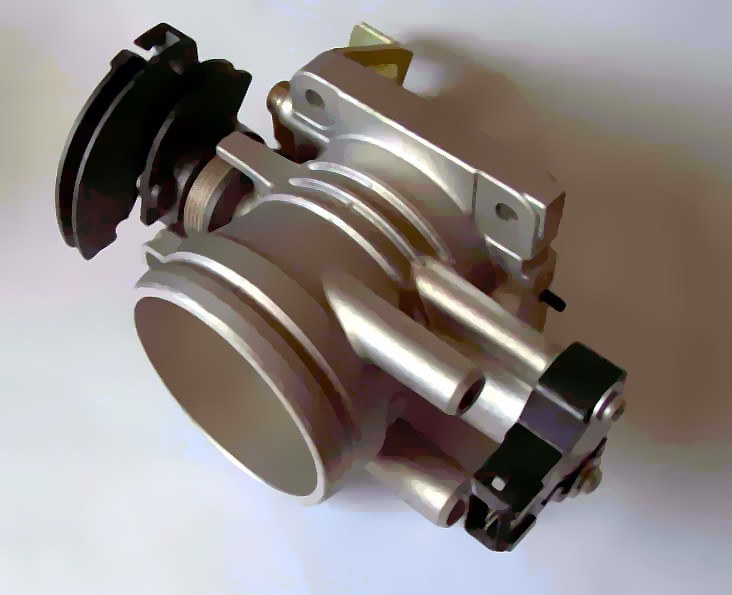
Throttle body showing throttle position sensor on the right

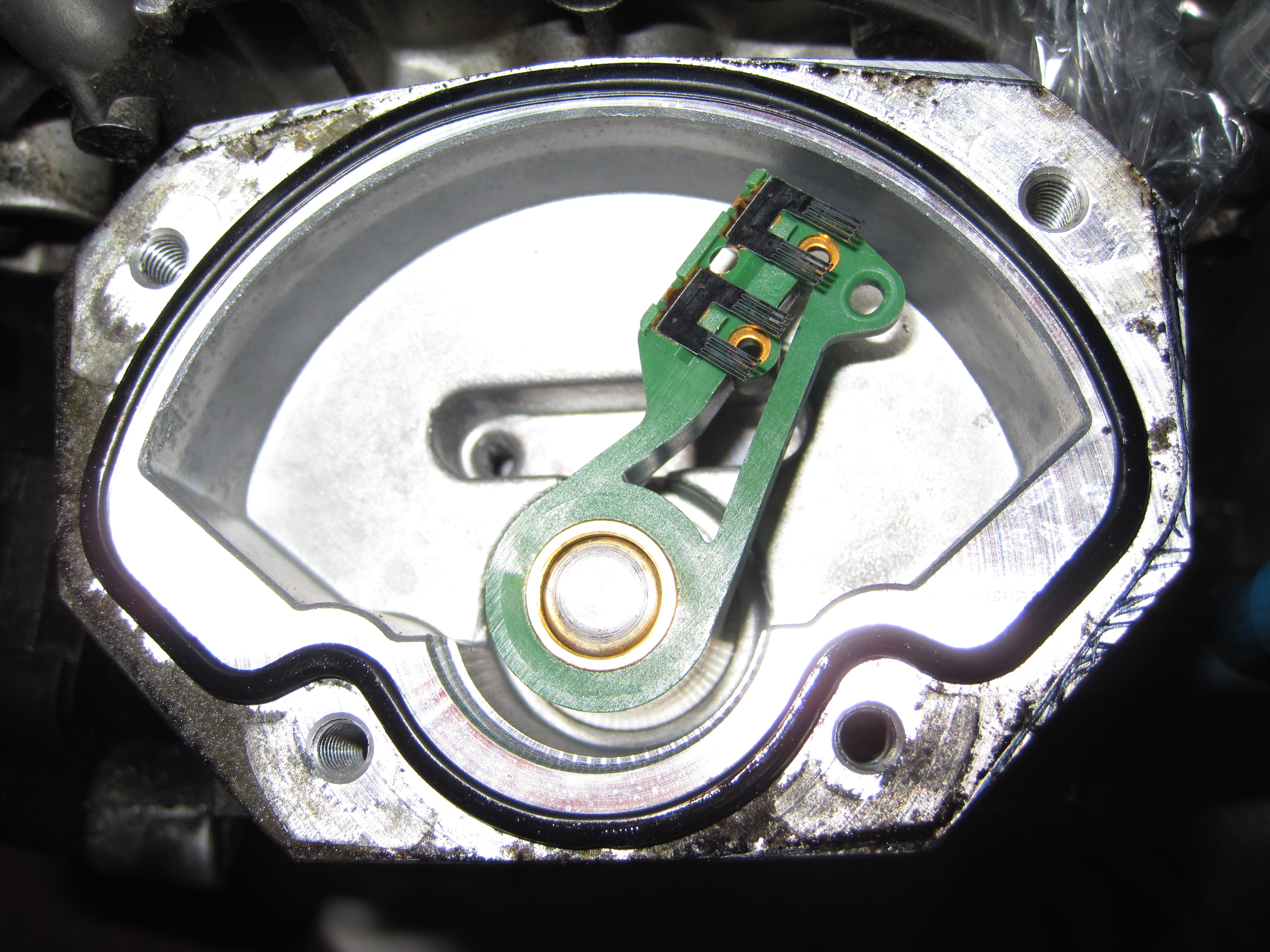
Potentiometric type sensor, showing the multi-finger metal brush/rake...

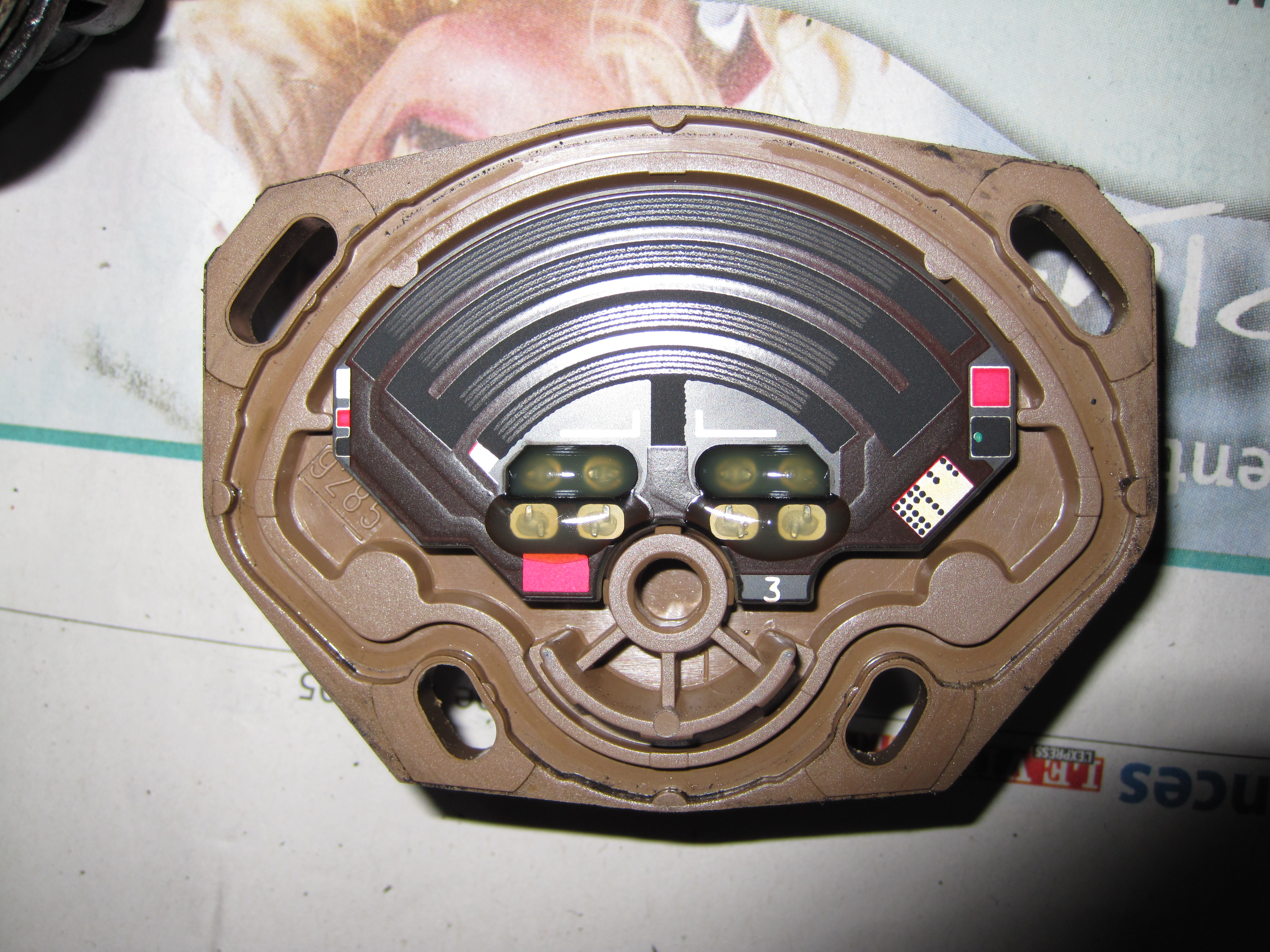
...and the resistive strips.

A throttle position sensor (TPS) is a sensor used to monitor the throttle body valve position for the ECU of an engine. The sensor is usually located on the butterfly spindle/shaft, so that it can directly monitor the position of the throttle. More advanced forms of the sensor are also used. For example, an extra "closed throttle position sensor" (CTPS) may be employed to indicate that the throttle is completely closed. Some engine control units (ECUs) also control the throttle position by electronic throttle control (ETC) or "drive by wire" systems, and if that is done, the position sensor is used in a feedback loop to enable that control.

Related to the TPS are accelerator pedal sensors, which often include a wide open throttle (WOT) sensor. The accelerator pedal sensors are used in electronic throttle control or "drive by wire" systems, and the most common use of a wide open throttle sensor is for the kick-down function on automatic transmissions.

Modern day sensors are non contact type. These modern non contact TPS include Hall effect sensors, inductive sensors, magnetoresistive and others. In the potentiometric type sensors, a multi-finger metal brush/rake is in contact with a resistive strip, while the butterfly valve is turned from the lower mechanical stop (minimum air position) to WOT, there is a change in the resistance and this change in resistance is given as the input to the ECU.

Non contact type TPS work on the principle of Hall effect or inductive sensors, or magnetoresistive technologies, wherein generally the magnet or inductive loop is the dynamic part which is mounted on the butterfly valve throttle spindle/shaft gear and the sensor & signal processing circuit board is mounted within the ETC gear box cover and is stationary. When the magnet/inductive loop mounted on the spindle which is rotated from the lower mechanical stop to WOT, there is a change in the magnetic field for the sensor. The change in the magnetic field is sensed by the sensor and the voltage generated is given as the input to the ECU. Normally a two pole rare-earth magnet is used for the TPS due to their high Curie temperatures required in the under-hood vehicle environment. The magnet may be of diametrical type, ring type, rectangular or segment type. The magnet is defined to have a certain magnetic field that does not vary significantly with time or temperature.

== See also ==
- List of auto parts
- List of sensors
