= Early fuel evaporator =

The early fuel evaporator is a device found in some internal combustion engines with carburetors. It can sometimes be referred to as an electronic fuel evaporator. The device on a car, commonly referred to as an EFE heater, is located between the throttle body of the carburetor and the intake manifold as a gasket and contains a resistance grid that heats the air/fuel mixture. The purpose of the EFE heater is to aid with vaporization of fuel in cold conditions, as well as to reduce exhaust emissions by running for about two minutes to allow for leaner choke calibrations.

== Included vehicles ==
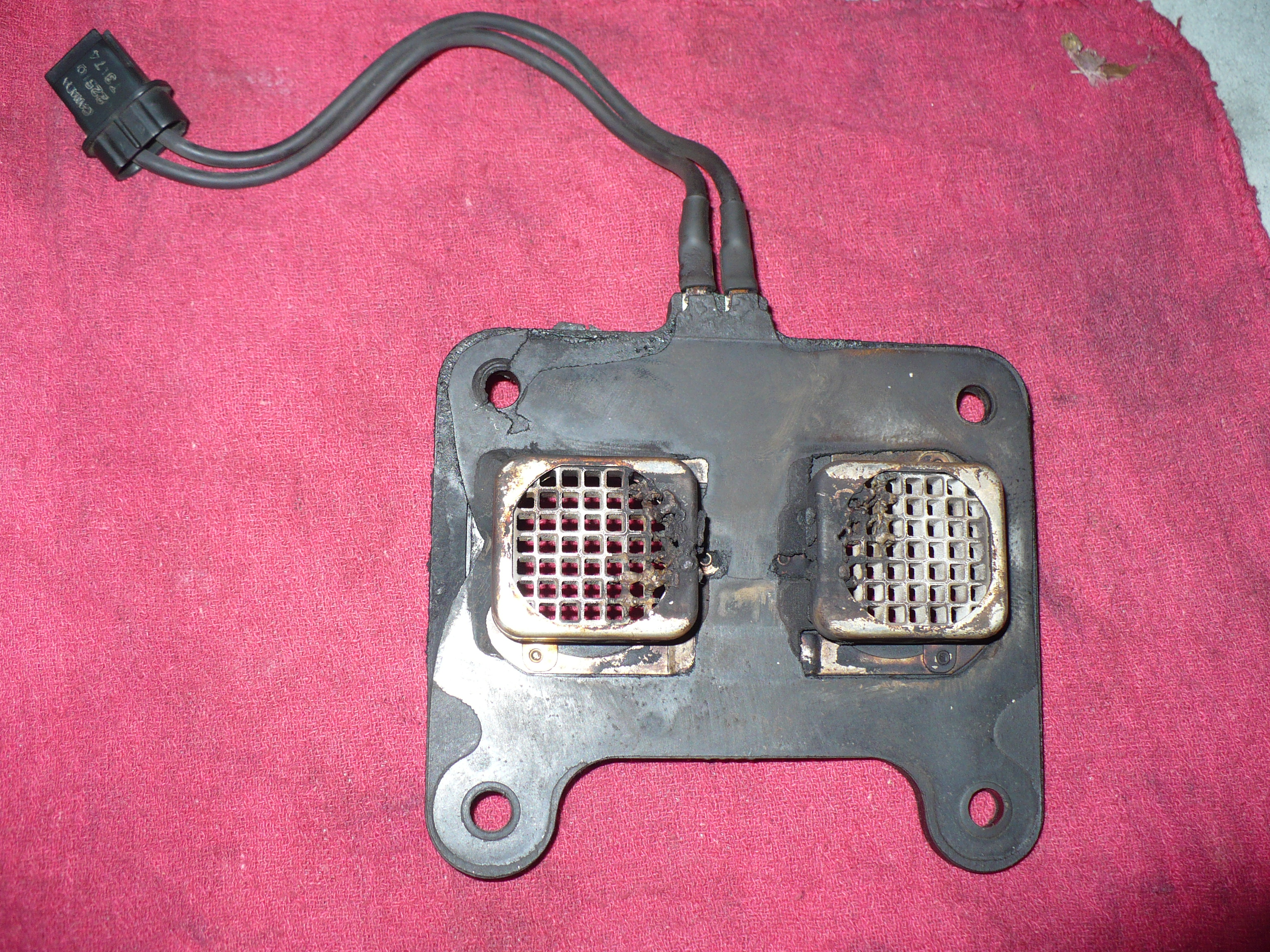
Photo of the bottom side of a stock EFE heater within a seat gasket from a 1985 Oldsmobile Cutlass Supreme Brougham.

Known vehicles that include EFE heaters are:

- Oldsmobile Cutlass Supreme 3.8L carbureted (1984–1987),
- Oldsmobile Cutlass Ciera 2.8L carbureted Canadian version (1985–?),
- Chevy Malibu 3.8L carbureted (1982–1984),
- Chevrolet Chevette 1.6L carbureted (1981–1986),
- Honda Accord (1987–1989), carbureted possibly earlier models.
- Chevrolet Celebrity/Citation and Pontiac 6000/Phoenix, 2.8L V6 carbureted (1982–1986)
- Buick Century, Limited, 3.0L V6 Carbureted 1984 Check under-hood label if EFE gasket needed or not.
- Fiat Duna 1.4/1.6L carbureted (1985-2001, Argentina/Brasil)
