= Hydrolock =

Type of hydraulic compression system failure

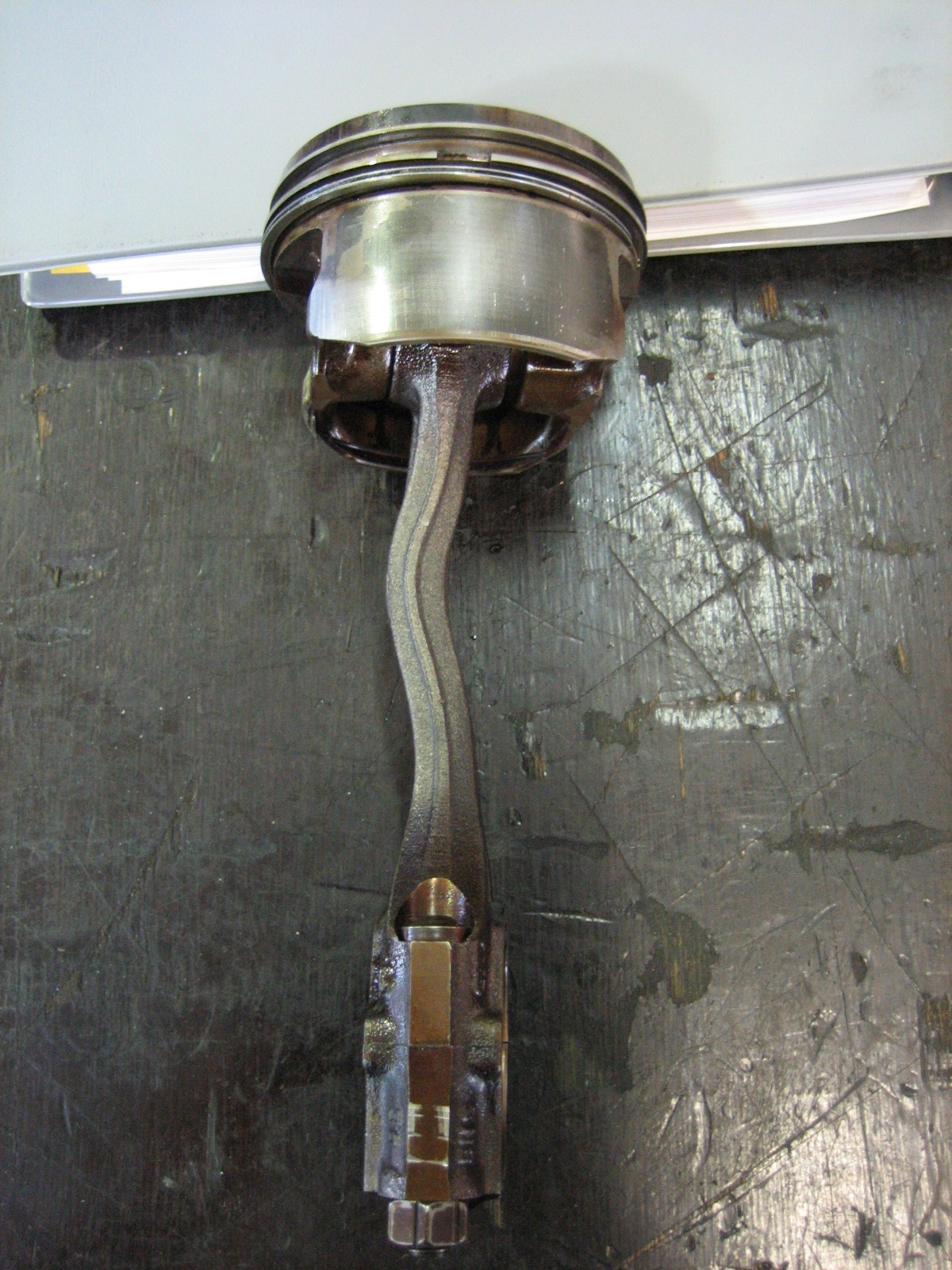
Bent connecting rod after hydrolock

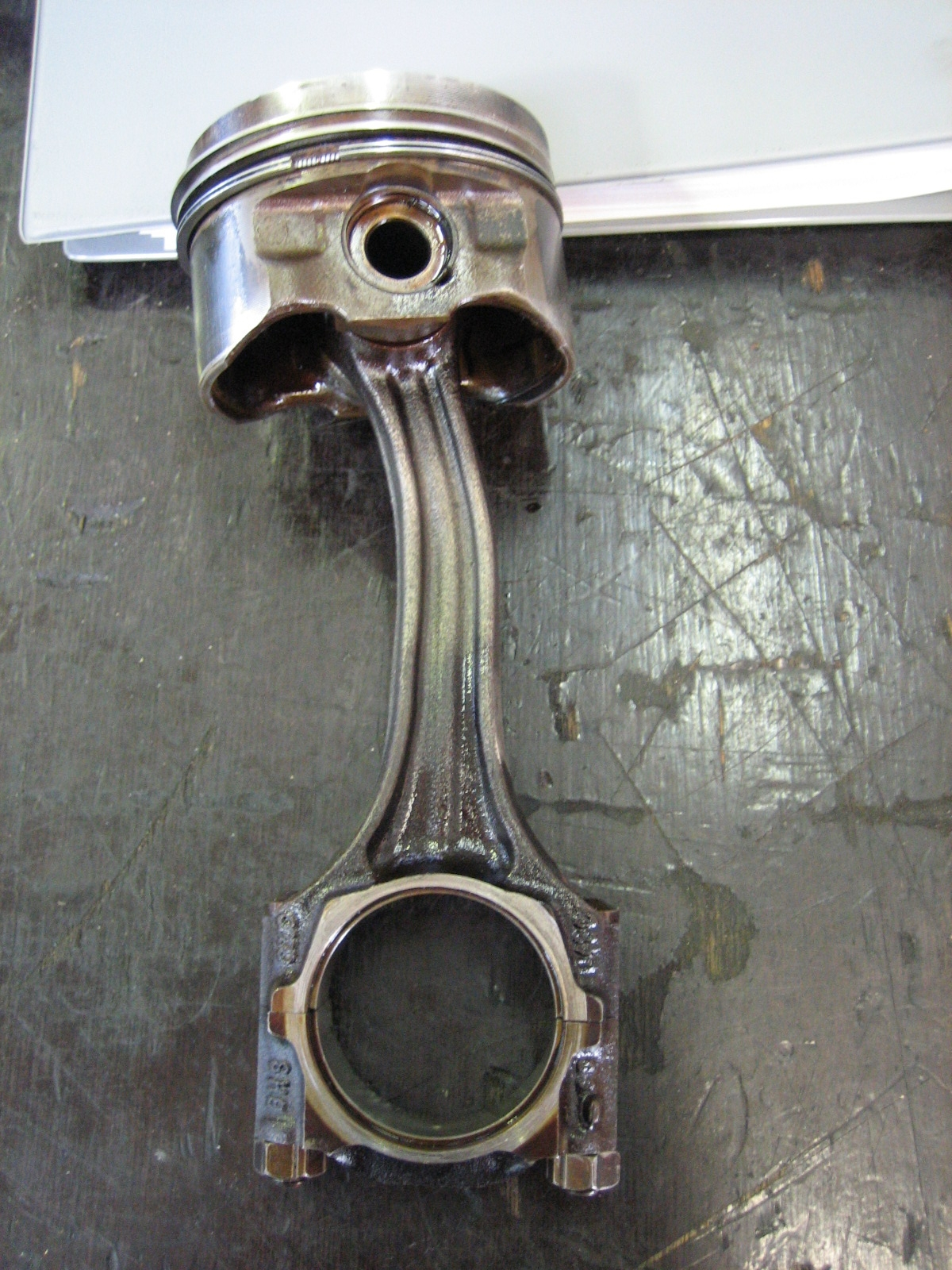
Same connecting rod, turned 90°

Hydrolock (a shorthand notation for hydrostatic lock or hydraulic lock) is an abnormal condition of any device which is designed to compress a gas by mechanically restraining it caused by a liquid entering the device. In the case of a reciprocating internal combustion engine, a piston cannot complete its travel and mechanical failure may occur if a volume of liquid greater than the volume of the cylinder at its minimum (end of the piston's stroke) enters the cylinder, due to the incompressibility of liquids.

== Symptoms and damage ==
If an engine hydrolocks while at speed, a mechanical failure is likely. Common damage modes include bent or broken connecting rods, a fractured crank, a fractured head, a fractured block, crankcase damage, damaged bearings, or any combination of these. Forces absorbed by other interconnected components may cause additional damage. Physical damage to metal parts can manifest as a "crashing" or "screeching" sound and usually requires replacement of the engine or a substantial rebuild of its major components.

If an internal combustion engine hydrolocks while idling or under low power conditions, the engine may stop suddenly with no immediate damage. In this case the engine can often be purged by unscrewing the spark plugs or injectors and turning the engine over to expel the liquid from the combustion chambers after which a restart may be attempted. Depending on how the liquid was introduced to the engine, it possibly can be restarted and dried out with normal combustion heat, or it may require more work, such as flushing out contaminated operating fluids and replacing damaged gaskets.

If a cylinder fills with liquid while the engine is turned off, the engine will refuse to turn when a starting cycle is attempted. Since the starter mechanism's torque is normally much lower than the engine's operating torque, this will usually not damage the engine but may burn out the starter. The engine can be drained as above and restarted. If a corrosive substance such as water has been in the engine long enough to cause rusting, more extensive repairs will be required.

Amounts of water significant enough to cause hydrolock tend to upset the air/fuel mixture in gasoline engines. If water is introduced slowly enough, this effect can cut power and speed in an engine to a point that when hydrolock actually occurs it does not cause catastrophic engine damage.

== Causes and special cases ==
=== Automotive ===
Hydrolock most commonly occurs in automobiles when driving through floods, either where the water is above the level of the air intake or the vehicle's speed is excessive, creating a tall bow wave. A vehicle fitted with a cold air intake mounted low on the vehicle will be especially vulnerable to hydrolocking when being driven through standing water or heavy precipitation. Engine coolant entering the cylinders through various means (such as a blown head gasket) is another common cause. Excessive fuel entering (flooding) one or more cylinders in liquid form due to abnormal operating conditions can also cause hydrolock.

=== Marine ===
Small boats with outboard engines and personal water crafts (PWC) tend to ingest water simply because they run in and around it. During a rollover, or when a wave washes over the craft, its engine can hydrolock, though severe damage is rare due to the special air intakes and low rotating inertia of small marine engines. Inboard marine engines have a different vulnerability as these often have their cooling water mixed with the exhaust gases in the header to quiet the engine. Rusted out exhaust headers or lengthy periods of turning the starter can cause water to build up in the exhaust line to the point it back-flows through the exhaust manifold and fills the cylinders. On turbocharged engines the intercooler is normally cooled by sea water; if this rusts through, water will be ingested by the engine.

=== Diesel engines ===
Diesel engines are more susceptible to hydrolock than gasoline engines. Due to their higher compression ratios, diesel engines have a much smaller final combustion chamber volume, requiring much less liquid to hydrolock. Diesel engines also tend to have higher torque, rotating inertia, and stronger starter motors than gasoline engines. The result is that a diesel engine is more likely to suffer catastrophic damage.

=== Radial and inverted engines ===
Hydrolock is common on radial and inverted engines (cylinders pointing downwards) when the engine sits for a long period. Engine oil seeps down under gravity into the cylinder through various means (through the rings, valve guides, etc.) and can fill a cylinder with enough oil to hydrolock it. The seepage effect can be observed by the blue-white smoke commonly seen when a radial engine starts up. In order to prevent engine damage, it is universal practice for the ground crew or pilot to check for hydrolock during pre-flight inspection of the aircraft, typically by slowly cranking the propeller for several turns, either by hand or using the starter motor, to make sure the crankshaft cycles normally through all cylinders.

=== Steam engines ===
A hydraulic lock can occur in steam engines due to steam condensing back into water. In most steam engine designs there is a short time at the end of the return stroke of the piston when all the valves are shut and it is compressing any remaining steam. Water can be introduced from the boiler or in a cold engine, steam will condense to water on the cool walls of the cylinders and can potentially hydrolock an engine.

This is just as damaging as it is to internal combustion engines and in the case of a steam locomotive can be very dangerous as a broken connecting rod could puncture the firebox or boiler and cause a steam explosion. Steam engines (with the exception of small models and toy machines) are always fitted with cylinder drain cocks which are opened to allow excess water and steam to escape during warm up.

Cylinder drain cocks can be manual or automatic. One type of automatic drain cock contains a rolling ball which allows water to pass, but blocks the flow of steam. The ball occupies a horizontal cylinder slightly larger than the ball, allowing liquid water to flow past the ball. However, fast moving steam forces the ball to the end of the cylinder, where the ball blocks a discharge opening.
