= Air lock =

Air (gas) causing obstruction of liquid flow in a pipe

An air lock is a restriction of, or complete stoppage of liquid flow caused by vapour trapped in a high point of a liquid-filled pipe system. The gas, being less dense than the liquid, rises to any high points. This phenomenon is known as vapor lock, or air lock.

Flushing the system with high flow or pressures can help move the gas away from the highest point. Also, a tap (or automatic vent valve) can be installed to let the gas out.

Air lock problems often occur when one is trying to recommission a system after it has been deliberately (for servicing) or accidentally emptied. Take, for example, a central heating system using a circulating pump to pump water through radiators. When filling such a system, air is trapped in the radiators. This air has to be vented using screw valves built into the radiators. Depending on the pipe layout – if there are any upside down 'U's in the circuit – it will be necessary to vent the highest point(s). Otherwise, air lock may cause waterfall flow where the loss of hydraulic head is equal to the height of airlock; If the hydraulic grade line drops below the output of the pipe, the flow through that part of the circuit would stop completely. Note that circulating pumps usually do not generate enough pressure to overcome air locks.

== Undulating pipes ==
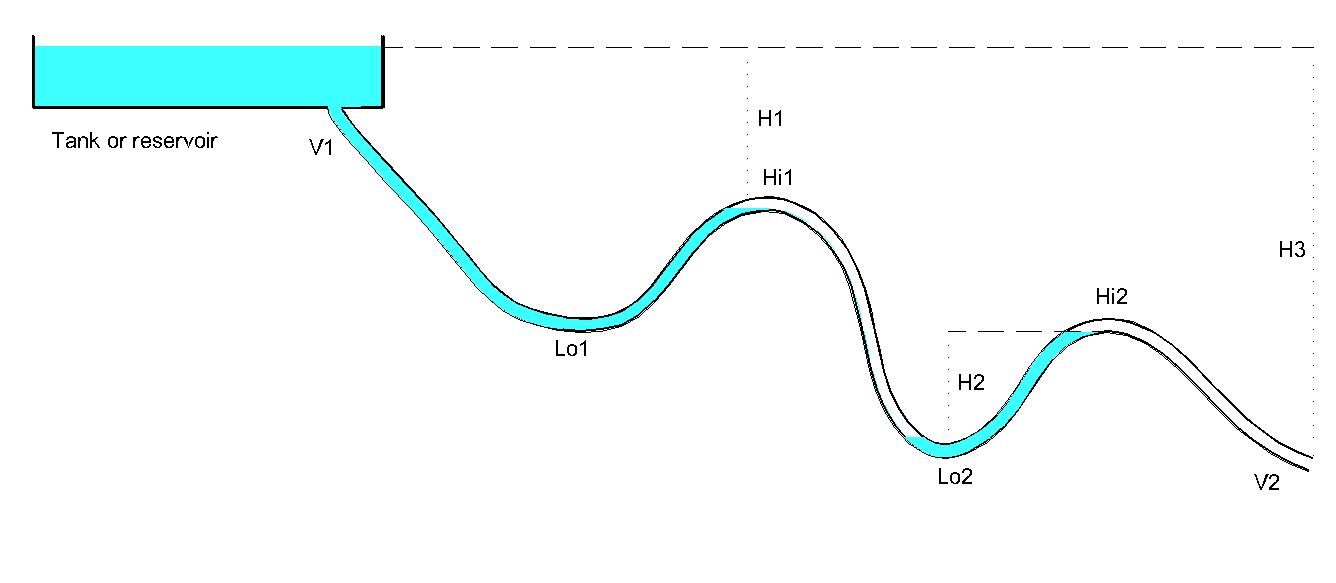
Gravity filling of an empty distribution pipe with undulating ground. The pressure on the trapped air is either H2 m of water (WG = water gauge) or H1, whichever is less.

A reservoir feeds a gravity distribution system, for drinking water or irrigation, with an outlet pipe going into the ground from the bottom of the reservoir. This pipe undulates with a series of alternating low points and high points. When the water drains from the reservoir, it will pass the first low point and fill as far as the first high point. If the water flow velocity is below the rising velocity of air bubbles, then water trickles down to the next low point and traps the remaining air between the first high point and the second low point.

As more water flows down, the upward leg after the second low point fills up. This exerts a pressure on the trapped air from the water on either side. If there is more water pressure from the section after the trapped air, then a full air lock is formed, and the water level stops at the first high point and no further water can flow. If there is more water pressure from the section before, then some water can flow, but the full pipe hydraulic head will not be reached and so flow is much less than expected. If there are further undulations, then the back pressure effects add together.

Long pipelines built across fairly level, but undulating land are bound to have many such high and low points. To avoid air or gas lock, automatic vents are fitted which let air or gas out when above a certain pressure. They may also be designed to let air in under vacuum. There are many other design considerations for design of water pipeline systems, e.g.

== Plumbing traps ==
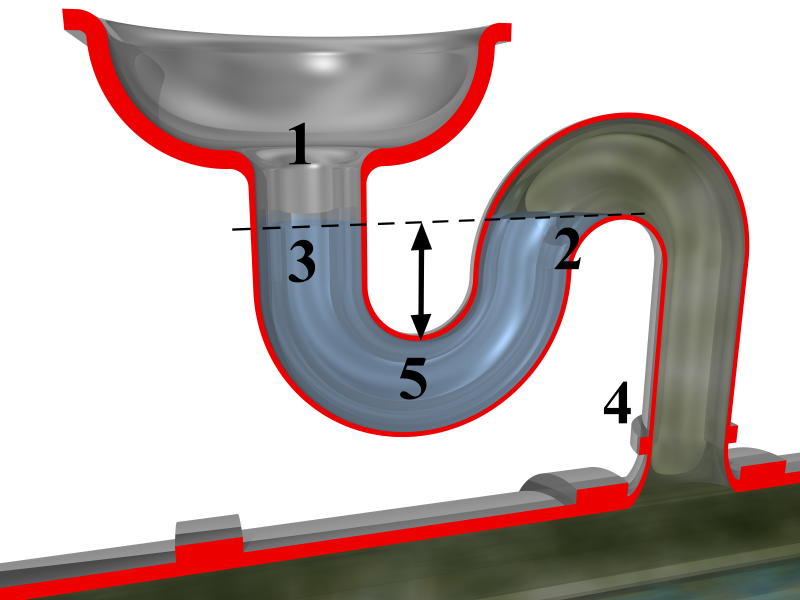
'S' trap inlet to drain

The air lock phenomenon can be used in a number of useful ways. An 'S' trap (a pipe that descends from a reservoir, then curves back up, then down again) allows liquid to flow from top to bottom unhindered, and gas cannot flow through the trap unless it has enough extra pressure to overcome the liquid head of the trap. This is usually about 75 to 100 mm of water and prevents foul smelling air coming back from water drainage systems via connections to toilets, sinks and so on. 'S' traps work well unless the drainage water has sand in it – which then collects in the 'U' part of the 'S'.

== See also ==
- Flush toilet⁣ – tank style with siphon-flush valve
- Siphon
- Vapor lock
