= Bob Fish (NASCAR owner) =

American NASCAR car owner

- This is the historic business of Mr. John Robert "Bob" Fish, known as "Fish Carburetor Corporation."
- Born: John Robert Fish
- Died: May 11, 1958
- Occupation: NASCAR car owner
- Known for: Inventing the "Fish Carburetor"
- Children: 1

John Robert Fish ( – May 11, 1958) was an American NASCAR Grand National Series race car owner whose career spanned from 1955 to 1958.

== Career ==
Fish was the possible inventor of the "Iron Lung" (formally known as a negative pressure ventilator) for his wife who was suffering from circulation problems. Another occasion had Fish cable the President of the United States on a lecture about using a simple pressure box to rescue sailors on a submarine.

Fish employed Fireball Roberts and Tommy Thompson as his main drivers. They started an average of 11th place and finished an average of 45th place. Fish's drivers would lead only four laps out of 106. However, they did manage one finish in the top ten while driving only a grand total of 352.8 miles or 567.8 kilometres. Fireball Roberts' 11th place championship finish in 1958 was the best accomplishment in Fish's career. Mr. Fish would eventually walk away from his NASCAR career earning a meager $390 ($4,352.08 when adjusted for inflation). Fish would also be the inventor of the famous "Fish Carburetor" which was first made in the early 1930s.

However, the "Original Equipment" establishment felt that it was an intolerable threat, and Mr. Fish would suffer many years of dirty tricks, harassment and persecution. Fish would eventually move to Florida where he could sell his products to wealthy game fishermen without the harassment he had back in California. Compared to the standard carburetors of that time, Fish's carburetor helped to stop the needless waste of fuel on cornering, braking, and hard acceleration.

For the time, it was considered to be "environmentally friendly" for that reason alone. Today, NASCAR uses fuel injection, which has made carburetors obsolete in the Sprint Cup Series.

Fish died on May 11, 1958 after suffering a stroke the previous month.
