= Reece Fish Carburettor =

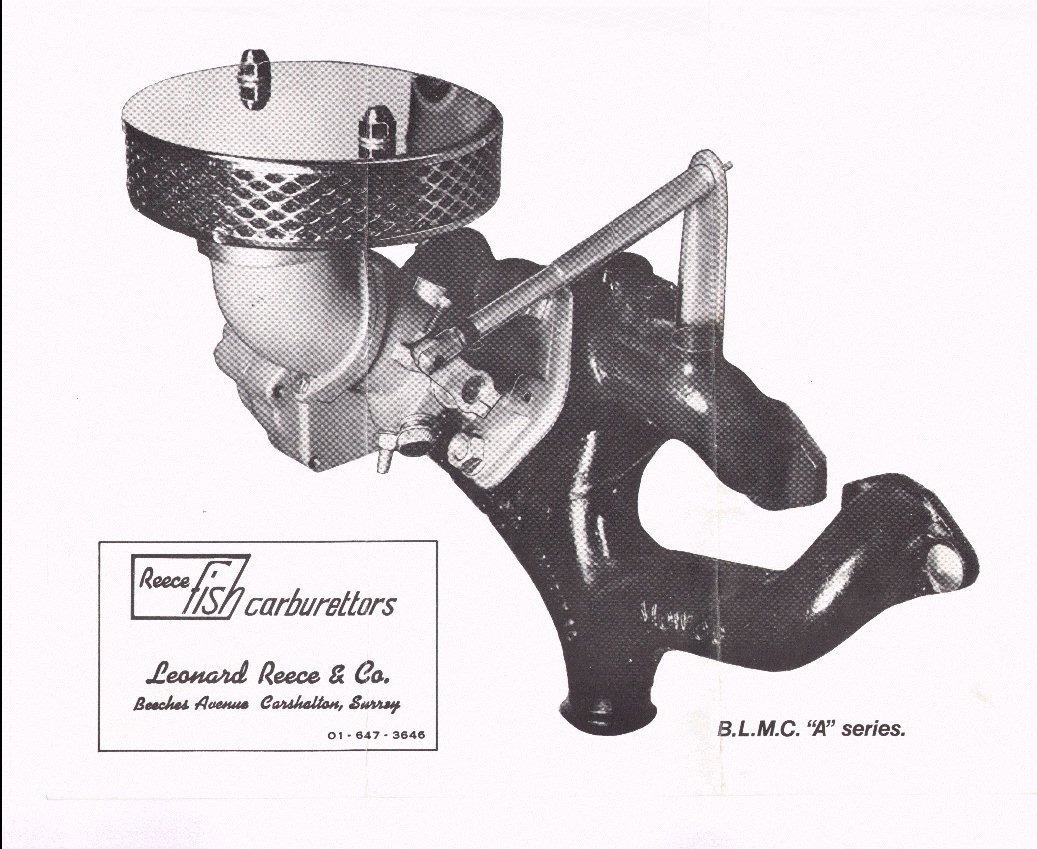
- Reece-Fish Carburetor fitted to BMC A series inlet / exhaust manifold

Overview
- Manufacturer: Leonard Reece & Co
- Production: 1969–1984

Powertrain
- Engine: A-series, 850–1275 cc I4

The Reece-Fish carburetor was a carburetor used by Mini Se7en racers in the 60s and 70s.

== Fish carburetor ==
The original Fish carburetor was developed in the 1930s by US hot-rodder Bob Fish.

The original intention of the Fish carburetor was to avoid the problems of the float chamber, and its sensitivity to sideways forces from acceleration and cornering. In the conventional carburetor, a venturi in the airflow creates a lowered pressure and this is enough to encourage the flow of fuel through the metering jets. The flow rate is critically sensitive to the fuel pressure at the jet, i.e. the hydrostatic head owing to the depth of fuel between the jet and the float level. Any sloshing within the float chamber affected this. Fish's design kept the float chamber, but avoided the dependency of flow rate on fuel depth. The float chamber was sealed and pressurized by a ram air effect from the air inlet, which then caused fuel to flow through the metering jet. This flow rate was entirely independent of fuel level, but did remain approximately proportional to the mass airflow. The Fish carburetor was also sensitive to mass airflow, rather than volume airflow, making it self-compensating for changes due to temperature or altitude.

A second problem with the conventional carburetor was its good performance in steady conditions, but poor progression: its dynamic ability to respond, such as when suddenly opening the throttle. This could give 'flat spots' in performance, or required great additional complexity to the carburetor such as multiple chokes, emulsion tubes and accelerator pumps. The Fish carburetor metered its fuel flow through a calibrated tapered groove, connected directly to the accelerator pedal and the throttle butterfly. The fuel metering orifice was controlled in immediate proportion to the throttle position, in a similar manner to the motorcycle slide carburetor. Between the float chamber and the venturi, an additional chamber, unique to the Fish design, contains the metering arm and groove. The arm is attached to the throttle spindle, moves with it, and is drilled with a hollow channel supplying fuel to the jets on the throttle spindle. This arm has an inlet hole at its end, which is a simple drilling and not of precise size. The hole passes over the metering groove, which is a radial arc in one wall of the chamber and it is the width of this groove which is precisely controlled, so as to accurately meter the fuel. As the throttle arm moves to the wide-throttle position, the arm sweeps across to the wider part of the groove, allowing more fuel to flow. The arm is close-fitting within the width of the chamber. As it moves, this close fit has the effect of a vane pump and acts as an accelerator pump to force additional fuel into the jet when the throttle is first opened.

The Fish carburetor improved over a number of other limitations too. Difficult vaporization of the fuel, particularly in cold weather or when starting, gave poor performance and required fuel enrichment with a 'choke' device. The Fish delivered fuel through a number of separate jets, built into the throttle spindle, which gave better dispersion of the fuel as atomized droplets, thus good vaporization. For this reason the Fish did not require a separate cold-start device.

US patents were granted for the carburetor in 1940, 1941 and 1957.

== Reece-Fish ==
The Reece-Fish is a variable choke, side- or downdraft design, with few moving parts to wear or adjust. To change from side-draft to downdraft, the installer simply rotates the float chamber to suit the carburetor orientation.

The engine tuner David Vizard rated this carburetor highly in his book Tuning the A Series Engine and also in recent on-line comments pertaining to the high fueling atomization characteristics of this carburetor suiting the Siamese port layout of BMC A-Series engines. Similarly, the author Clive Trickey rated these carburetors well in his book More Mini Tuning.

== Volkswagen downdraft set ==
The pictures below show a pair of Reece-Fish carburetors with manifold tubing suitable for an air-cooled Volkswagen engine. Note that Reece-Fish manufactured the tubing and manifolds as part of an after-market kit for this vehicle.

== Reproduction Reece-Fish carburetors ==
Production of an updated version of the original carburetor design was due to resume in mid-2016, thirty-two years after manufacture of the originals ceased. The new carburetors were to be produced in Colchester, Essex, UK by Leonard Reece & Co. Limited, a company unrelated to the original, but specifically created to re-introduce the Reece-Fish carburetor line.

The production was ceased and the project abandoned due to the cost of the insurance to trade and additionally with the lack of interest in the project. All of the working prototypes that were produced were sold.
