= Condensation (disambiguation) =

Condensation is the change of the state of matter from the gas phase into the liquid phase.

Condensation may also refer to:

- DNA condensation, the process of compacting DNA molecules
- Cloud condensation nuclei, airborne particles required for cloud formation
- Condensation (aerosol dynamics), a phase transition from gas to liquid
- Condensation cloud, observable at large explosions in humid air
- Condensation reaction, in chemistry, a chemical reaction between two molecules or moieties
- Condensation algorithm, in computer science, a computer vision algorithm
- Condensation (graph theory), in mathematics, a directed acyclic graph formed by contracting the strongly connected components of another graph
- Dodgson condensation, in mathematics, a method invented by Lewis Carroll for computing the determinants of square matrices
- Bose–Einstein condensation, a state of matter of a dilute gas in which quantum effects become apparent on a macroscopic scale
- Condensation (psychology)

Condensed may refer to:

- Condensed font, a typeface drawn narrower than normal width
- Condensed milk, milk with water removed
