= Throttle =

Control of engine power

A throttle is a mechanism by which fluid flow is managed by construction or obstruction.

An engine's power can be increased or decreased by the restriction of inlet gases (by the use of a throttle), but usually decreased. The term throttle has come to refer, informally, to any mechanism by which the power or speed of an engine is regulated, such as a car's accelerator pedal. What is often termed a throttle (in an aviation context) is also called a thrust lever, particularly for jet engine powered aircraft. For a steam locomotive, the valve which controls the steam is known as the regulator.

== Internal combustion engines ==
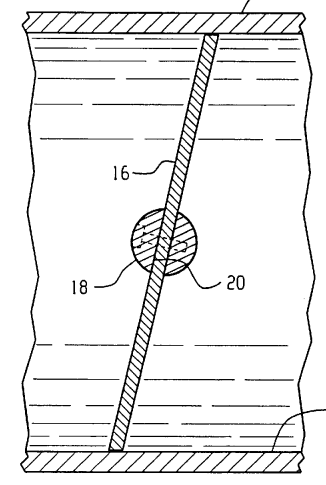
A cross-section view of a butterfly valve

In an internal combustion engine, the throttle is a means of controlling an engine's power by regulating the amount of fuel or air entering the engine. In a motor vehicle the control used by the driver to regulate power is sometimes called the throttle, accelerator, or gas pedal. For a gasoline engine, the throttle most commonly regulates the amount of air and fuel allowed to enter the engine. However, in a gasoline direct injection engine, the throttle regulates only the amount of fuel allowed to enter the engine.

Historically, the throttle pedal or lever acts via a direct mechanical linkage. The butterfly valve of the throttle is operated by means of an arm piece, loaded by a spring. This arm is usually directly linked to the accelerator cable, and operates in accordance with the driver action. The further the pedal is pushed, the wider the throttle valve opens so that more air flow occurs, and then the carburetor responds by creating more fuel flow.

Modern engines of both types (gas and diesel) are commonly drive-by-wire systems where sensors monitor the driver controls and in response a computerized system controls the flow of fuel and air. This means that the operator does not have direct control over the flow of fuel and air; the Engine Control Unit (ECU) can achieve better control in order to reduce emissions, maximize performance and adjust the engine idle to make a cold engine warm up faster or to account for eventual additional engine loads such as running air conditioning compressors in order to avoid engine stalls.

The throttle on a gasoline engine is typically a butterfly valve. In a fuel-injected engine, the throttle valve is placed on the entrance of the intake manifold, or housed in the throttle body. In a carbureted engine, it is found in the carburetor. When a throttle is wide open, the intake manifold is usually close to ambient atmospheric pressure. When the throttle is partially closed, manifold vacuum drops further below ambient pressure.

The power output of a diesel engine is controlled by regulating the quantity of fuel that is injected into the cylinder. Because diesel engines do not need to control air volumes, they usually lack a butterfly valve in the intake tract. An exception to this generalization is newer diesel engines meeting stricter emissions standards, where such a valve is used to generate intake manifold vacuum, thereby allowing the introduction of exhaust gas (see EGR) to lower combustion temperatures and thereby minimize NOx production.

In a reciprocating engine aircraft, the throttle control is usually a hand-operated lever or knob. It controls the engine power output, which may or may not reflect in a change of RPM, depending on the propeller installation (fixed-pitch or constant speed).

Some modern internal combustion engines do not use a traditional throttle, instead relying on their variable intake valve timing system to regulate the airflow into the cylinders, although the result is the same, albeit with less pumping losses.

== Throttle body ==
The components of a typical throttle body

In fuel injected engines, the throttle body is the part of the air intake system that controls the amount of air flowing into the engine, in response to driver accelerator pedal input in the main. The throttle body is usually located between the air filter box and the intake manifold, and it is usually attached to, or near, the mass airflow sensor. Often, an engine coolant line also runs through it in order for the engine to draw intake air at a certain temperature (the engine's current coolant temperature, which the ECU senses through the relevant sensor) and therefore with a known density.

The largest piece inside the throttle body is the throttle plate, which is a butterfly valve that regulates the airflow.

On many cars, the accelerator pedal motion is communicated via the throttle cable, which is mechanically connected to the throttle linkages, which, in turn, rotate the throttle plate. In cars with electronic throttle control (also known as "drive-by-wire"), an electric actuator controls the throttle linkages and the accelerator pedal connects not to the throttle body, but to a sensor, which outputs a signal proportional to the current pedal position and sends it to the ECU. The ECU then determines the throttle opening based on the accelerator pedal's position and inputs from other engine sensors such as the engine coolant temperature sensor.

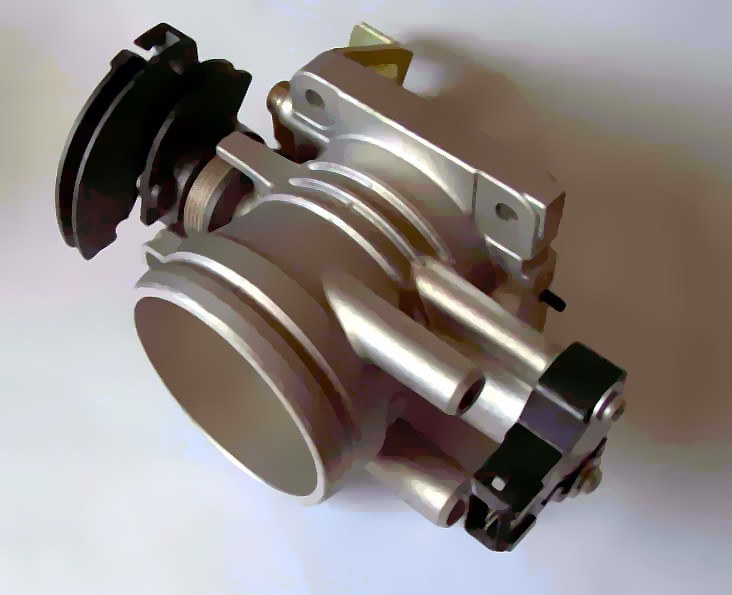
Throttle body showing throttle position sensor. The throttle cable attaches to the curved, black portion on the left. The copper-coloured coil visible next to this returns the throttle to its idle (closed) position when the pedal is released.

When the driver presses on the accelerator pedal, the throttle plate rotates within the throttle body, opening the throttle passage to allow more air into the intake manifold, immediately drawn inside by its vacuum. Usually a mass airflow sensor measures this change and communicates it to the ECU. The ECU then increases the amount of fuel injected by the injectors in order to obtain the required air-fuel ratio. Often a throttle position sensor (TPS) is connected to the shaft of the throttle plate to provide the ECU with information on whether the throttle is in the idle position, wide-open throttle (WOT) position, or somewhere in between these extremes.

Throttle bodies may also contain valves and adjustments to control the minimum airflow during idle. Even in those units that are not "drive-by-wire", there will often be a small solenoid driven valve, the Idle Air Control Valve (IACV), that the ECU uses to control the amount of air that can bypass the main throttle opening to allow the engine to idle when the throttle is closed.

Image of BMW S65 from the E92 BMW M3 showing eight individual throttle bodies

A throttle body is somewhat analogous to the carburetor in a non-injected engine, although it is important to remember that a throttle body is not the same thing as a throttle, and that carbureted engines have throttles as well. A throttle body simply supplies a convenient place to mount a throttle in the absence of a carburetor venturi. Carburetors are an older technology, which mechanically modulate the amount of air flow (with an internal throttle plate) and combine air and fuel together (venturi). Cars with fuel injection don't need a mechanical device to meter the fuel flow, since that duty is taken over by injectors in the intake pathways (for multipoint fuel injection systems) or cylinders (for direct injection systems) coupled with electronic sensors and computers which precisely calculate how long should a certain injector stay open and therefore how much fuel should be injected by each injection pulse. However, they do still need a throttle to control the airflow into the engine, together with a sensor that detects its current opening angle, so that the correct air/fuel ratio can be met at any RPM and engine load combination. The simplest way to do this is to simply remove the carburetor unit, and bolt a simple unit containing a throttle body and fuel injectors on instead. This is known as single-port injection, also known by different marketing names (such as "throttle-body injection" by General Motors and "central fuel injection" by Ford, among others), and it allows an older engine design to be converted from carburetor to fuel injection without significantly altering the intake manifold design. More complex later designs use intake manifolds, and even cylinder heads, specially designed for the inclusion of injectors.

=== Multiple throttle bodies ===
Most fuel injected cars have a single throttle, contained in a throttle body. Vehicles can sometimes employ more than one throttle body, connected by linkages to operate simultaneously, which improves throttle response and allows a straighter path for the airflow to the cylinder head, as well as for equal-distance intake runners of short length, difficult to achieve when all the runners have to travel to certain location to connect to a single throttle body, at the cost of greater complexity and packaging issues. At the extreme, higher-performance cars like the E92 BMW M3 and Ferraris, and high-performance motorcycles like the Yamaha R6, can use a separate throttle body for each cylinder, often called "individual throttle bodies" or ITBs. Although rare in production vehicles, these are common equipment on many racing cars and modified street vehicles. This practice harks back to the days when many high performance cars were given one, small, single-venturi carburettor for each cylinder or pair of cylinders (i.e. Weber, SU carburettors), each one with their own small throttle plate inside. In a carburettor, the smaller throttle opening also allowed for more precise and fast carburettor response, as well as better atomization of the fuel when running at low engine speeds.

== Other engines ==
Steam locomotives normally have the throttle (North American English) or regulator (British English) in a characteristic steam dome at the top of the boiler (although not all boilers feature these). The additional height afforded by the dome helps to avoid any liquid (e.g. from bubbles on the surface of the boiler water) being drawn into the throttle valve, which could damage it, or lead to priming. The throttle is basically a poppet valve, or series of poppet valves which open in sequence to regulate the amount of steam admitted to the steam chests over the pistons. It is used in conjunction with the reversing lever to start, stop and to control the locomotive's power although, during steady-state running of most locomotives, it is preferable to leave the throttle wide open and to control the power by varying the steam cut-off point (which is done with the reversing lever), as this is more efficient. A steam locomotive throttle valve poses a difficult design challenge as it must be opened and closed using hand effort against the considerable pressure (typically 250 psi or 1,700 kPa) of boiler steam. One of the primary reasons for later multiple-sequential valves: it is far easier to open a small poppet valve against the pressure differential, and open the others once pressure begins to equalize than to open a single large valve, especially as steam pressures eventually exceeded 200 psi (1,400 kPa) or even 300 psi (2,100 kPa). Examples include the balanced "double beat" type used on Gresley A3 Pacifics.

Electric vehicle throttle is controlled with Hall-effect sensor.

Throttling of a rocket engine means varying the thrust level in-flight. This is not always a requirement; in fact, the thrust of a solid-fuel rocket is not controllable after ignition, and is instead pre-planned by varying the shape of the void down the center of the booster when the fuel is molded. However, liquid-propellant rockets can be throttled by means of valves which regulate the flow of fuel and oxidizer to the combustion chamber. Hybrid rocket engines, such as the one used in Space Ship One, use solid fuel with a liquid oxidizer, and therefore can be throttled. Throttling tends to be required more for powered landings, and launch into space using a single main stage (such as the Space Shuttle), than for launch with multistage rockets. They are also useful in situations where the airspeed of the vehicle must be limited due to aerodynamic stress in the denser atmosphere at lower levels (e.g. the Space Shuttle). Rockets characteristically become lighter the longer they burn, with the changing ratio of thrust:weight resulting in increasing acceleration, so engines are often throttled (or switched off) to limit acceleration forces towards the end of a stage's burn time if it is carrying sensitive cargo (e.g. humans).

In a jet engine, thrust is controlled by changing the amount of fuel flowing into the combustion chamber, similar to a diesel engine.

== Lifespan of the throttle in cars ==
The lifespan of the throttle is not set since it highly depends on the driving style and specific vehicle. The throttle tends to be quite dirty after 100-150 thousand kilometers, and it is necessary to clean it up. The malfunction of the throttle could be indicated by illuminated EPC warning light. This is usually the case with modern Volkswagen Group vehicles. Vehicles not equipped with the EPC warning light indicate issues with the throttle by illuminated check engine symbol.

Symptoms of the throttle malfunction could vary from poor idle, decreased engine power, poor mileage, bad acceleration, and so on. The effective way to increase the throttle's lifespan is through regular maintenance and cleaning.

== See also ==
- Adapted automobile
