= Carburetor =

Component of internal combustion engines which mixes air and fuel in a controlled ratio

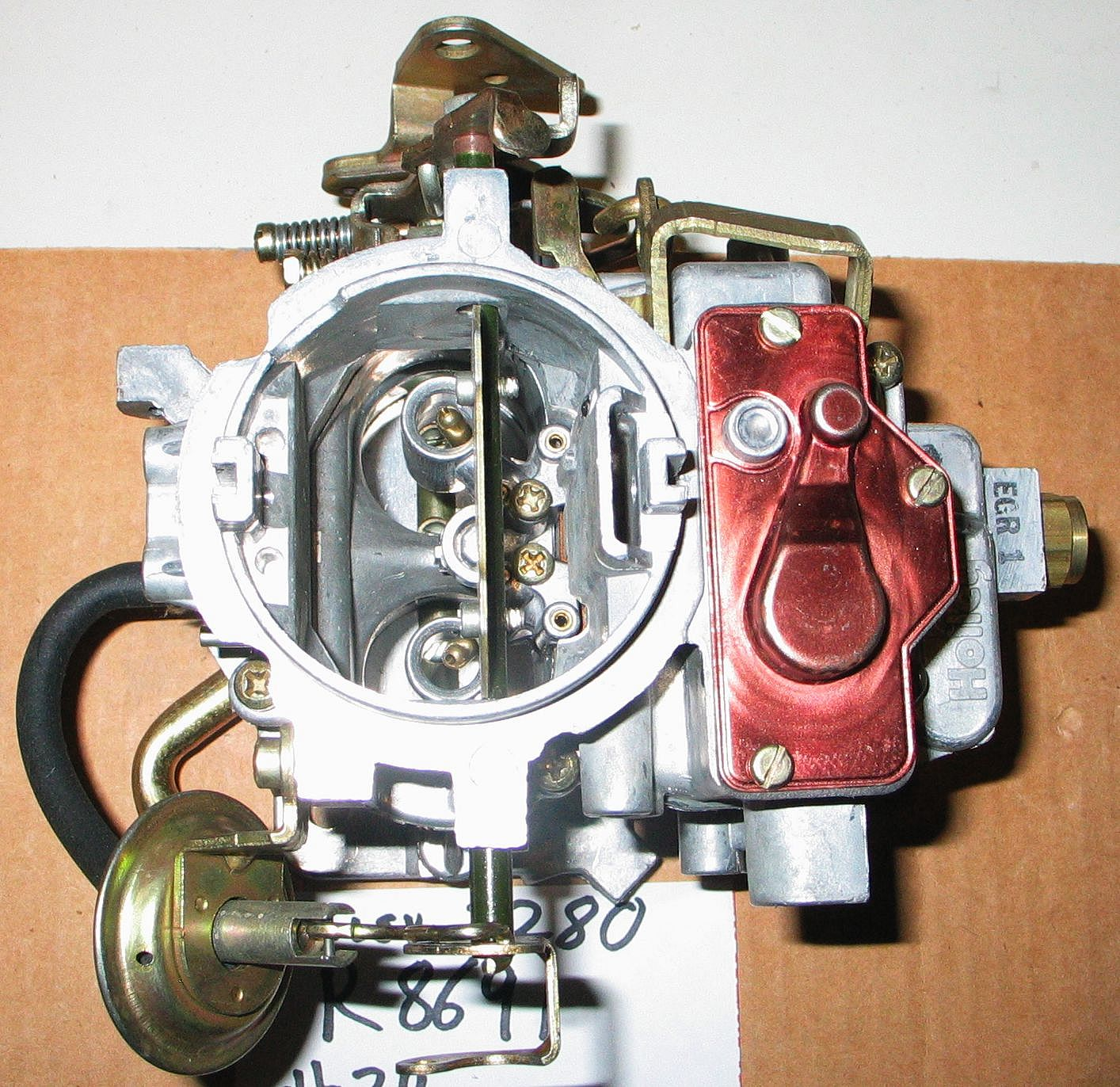
Two-barrel downdraft Holley 2280 carburetor

Cross-sectional schematic

A carburetor (also spelled carburettor or carburetter) is a device used by a gasoline internal combustion engine to control and mix air and fuel entering the engine. The primary method of adding fuel to the intake air is through the Venturi effect or Bernoulli's principle or with a pitot tube in the main metering circuit, though various other components are also used to provide extra fuel or air in specific circumstances.

Since the 1990s, carburetors have been largely replaced by fuel injection for cars and trucks, but carburetors are still used by some small engines (e.g. lawnmowers, generators, and concrete mixers), motorcycles, and smaller outboard engines. In addition, they are still widely used on piston-engine–driven aircraft. Diesel engines have always used fuel injection instead of carburetors, as they do not compress an air-fuel mix and instead require fuel injection much later in the compression stroke.

== Etymology ==
The term "carburetor" is derived from the English verb carburet, meaning "to charge with hydrocarbons"; in early motoring books the product of the carburetor is carburetted air, i.e. air charged with hydrocarbon vapour. This meaning superseded that from the late eighteenth century in which carburet was a noun for which we now use the word carbide. A carburetor charges the intake air with vapour from a hydrocarbon-based fuel, such as petrol or autogas.

The name is spelled "carburetor" in American English and "carburettor" in British English. Colloquial abbreviations include "carb" in the UK and North America or "carby" in Australia.

== Operating principle ==
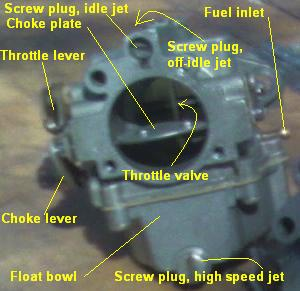
1979 Evinrude Type I side draft carburetor

Air from the atmosphere enters the carburetor (usually via an air cleaner), has fuel added within the carburetor, then the air fuel mixture leaves the carburetor and enters the inlet manifold, then through the inlet valve(s), and finally into the combustion chamber. Most engines use a single carburetor shared among all of the cylinders, though some high-performance engines historically had multiple carburetors and/or throats.

The simplest carburetors work on Bernoulli's principle: the static pressure of the flowing air at the fuel entry point, which can be in a tube which is constant diameter, reduces at higher speeds compared with the pressure in the float chamber which is vented to ambient air pressure, with the pressure difference then forcing more fuel into the airstream. If the tube is a constant diameter the configuration is slightly simpler than in the cross-section diagram shown above right.

In most cases (except for the accelerator pump), the driver pressing the throttle pedal does not directly increase the fuel entering the engine. Instead, the airflow through the carburetor increases, which in turn increases the amount of fuel drawn into the intake mixture.

Bernoulli's Principle applies (apart from friction and viscosity and turbulence etc.) to both the air and the fuel, so that the pressure reduction in the air flow tends to be proportional to the square of the intake airspeed, and the fuel in the main jets will obtain a speed as the square root of the pressure reduction so the two will be proportional to each other. If the pressure reduction is taken as from a reduction of area along the air flow rather than from ambient pressure to the fuel entry point the effect can be described as the Venturi effect, but that is still derived from Bernoulli's principle at two positions. If the pressure reduction is taken as from a dynamic pressure (facing the incoming air) within the air entry point rather than from ambient pressure instead the carbureter can be described as the Pitot tube type, but that is also still derived from Bernoulli's principle at two positions.

The actual fuel and air flows are more complicated and need correction. This might be done variously at lower speeds or higher speeds, or over the whole range by a variable emulsion device to add air to the fuel after the main jets/s. In SU and other (e.g. Zenith-Stromberg) variable jet carburetors, it was mainly controlled by varying the jet size.

The orientation of the carburetor is a key design consideration. Older engines used updraft carburetors, where the air enters from below the carburetor and exits through the top. From the late 1930s, downdraft carburetors become more commonly used (especially in the United States), along with side draft carburetors (especially in Europe).

== Fuel circuits ==
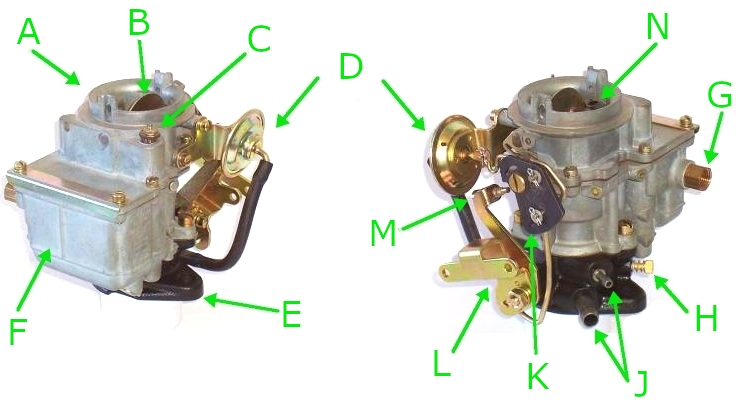
A - airhorn; B - choke plate; C - external bowl vent; D - choke pull-off; E - throttle body and mounting base; F - float bowl; G - fuel inlet; H - idle mixture adjusting screw; J - vacuum nipples; K - fast-idle cam; L - throttle lever; M - idle speed adjusting crackscrew; N - internal bowl vent

=== Main metering circuit ===
The main metering circuit usually consists of barrel/s which reduces to a narrow part where the air is at its highest speed, forming a choke or venturi. Fuel is usually introduced into the air stream at that narrow part through small tubes leading from the main jet. The change in area is only necessary for a Venturi carburetor but in other configurations the barrel/s can be of constant area with the fuel entry anywhere along it.

Downstream of a choke or venturi is a throttle (usually in the form of a butterfly valve) which is used to control the amount of air entering the carburetor. In a car, this throttle is usually mechanically connected to the vehicle's throttle pedal, which varies engine speed.

At lesser throttle openings, the air speed may be insufficient to maintain the main fuel flow, so then the fuel may be supplied by the carburetor's idle and off-idle circuits usually near the narrow gap between the edge of the butterfly plate and the body to give sufficient local air speed.

At greater throttle openings, the speed of air increases, which lowers the pressure of the air and draws more fuel into the airstream. At the same time, the reduced manifold vacuum results in less fuel flow through the idle and off-idle circuits.

==== Choke ====
During cold weather fuel vaporizes less readily and tends to condense on the walls of the intake manifold, starving the cylinders of fuel and making cold starts difficult. Additional fuel is required (for a given amount of air) to start and run the engine until it warms up, provided by a choke valve.

While the engine is warming up the choke valve is partially closed, restricting the flow of air at the entrance to the carburetor. This increases the vacuum in the main metering circuit, causing more fuel to be supplied to the engine via the main jets. Prior to the late 1950s the choke was manually operated by the driver, often using a lever or knob on the dashboard. Since then, automatic chokes became more commonplace. These either use a bimetallic thermostat to automatically regulate the choke based on the temperature of the engine's coolant liquid, an electrical resistance heater to do so, or air drawn through a tube connected to an engine exhaust source. A choke left closed after the engine has warmed up increases the engine's fuel consumption and exhaust gas emissions, and causes the engine to run rough and lack power due to an over-rich fuel mixture.

However, excessive fuel can flood an engine and prevent it from starting. To remove the excess fuel, many carburetors with automatic chokes allow it to be held open (by manually, depressing the accelerator pedal to the floor and briefly holding it there while cranking the starter) to allow extra air into the engine until the excess fuel is cleared out.

Another method used by carburetors to improve the operation of a cold engine is a fast idle cam, which is connected to the choke and prevents the throttle from closing fully while the choke is in operation. The resulting increase in idle speed provides a more stable idle for a cold engine (by better atomizing the cold fuel) and helps the engine warm up quicker.

=== Idle circuit ===
In this motorcycle carburetor, G, M and T are the parts working when the engine is idling (pilot circuit), while E, F and N works at off-idle or at open throttle (main circuit). Improper tuning or damages within the pilot circuit can decrease engine performance at lower RPM

The system within a carburetor that meters fuel when the engine is running at low RPM. The idle circuit is generally activated by vacuum near the (near closed) throttle plate, where the air speed increases to cause a low-pressure area in the idle passage/port, thus causing fuel to flow through the idle jet. The idle jet is set at some constant value by the carburetor manufacturer, thus flowing a specified amount of fuel.

=== Off-idle circuit ===
Many carburetors use an off-idle circuit, which includes an additional fuel jet which is briefly used as the throttle starts to open. This jet is located in a low-pressure area caused by the high air speed near the (partly closed) throttle. The additional fuel it provides is used to compensate for the reduced vacuum that occurs when the throttle is opened, thus smoothing the transition from the idle circuit to the main metering circuit.

=== Power valve ===
In a four-stroke engine it is often desirable to provide extra fuel to the engine at high loads (to increase the power output and reduce engine knocking). A 'power valve', which is a spring-loaded valve in the carburetor that is held shut by engine vacuum, is often used to do so. As the airflow through the carburetor increases, the reduced manifold vacuum pulls the power valve open, allowing more fuel into the main metering circuit.

In a two-stroke engine, the carburetor power valve operates in the opposite manner: in most circumstances the valve allows extra fuel into the engine, then at a certain engine RPM it closes to reduce the fuel entering the engine. This is done in order to extend the engine's maximum RPM, since many two-stroke engines can temporarily achieve higher RPM with a leaner air-fuel ratio.

This is not to be confused with the unrelated exhaust power valve arrangements used on two-stroke engines.

==== Metering rod / step-up rod ====
A metering rod or step-up rod system is sometimes used as an alternative to a power valve in a four-stroke engine in order to supply extra fuel at high loads. One end of the rods is tapered, which sits in the main metering jets and acts as a valve for fuel flow in the jets. At high engine loads, the rods are lifted away from the jets (either mechanically or using manifold vacuum), increasing the volume of fuel flow through the jet. These systems have been used by the Rochester Quadrajet and in the 1950s Carter carburetors.

=== Accelerator pump ===
While the main metering circuit can adequately supply fuel to the engine in steady-state conditions, the inertia of fuel (being higher than that of air) causes a temporary shortfall as the throttle is opened. Therefore, an accelerator pump is often used to briefly provide extra fuel as the throttle is opened. When the driver presses the throttle pedal, a small piston or diaphragm pump injects extra fuel directly into the carburetor throat.

The accelerator pump can also be used to "prime" an engine with extra fuel prior to attempting a cold start.

== Fuel supply ==
=== Float chamber ===
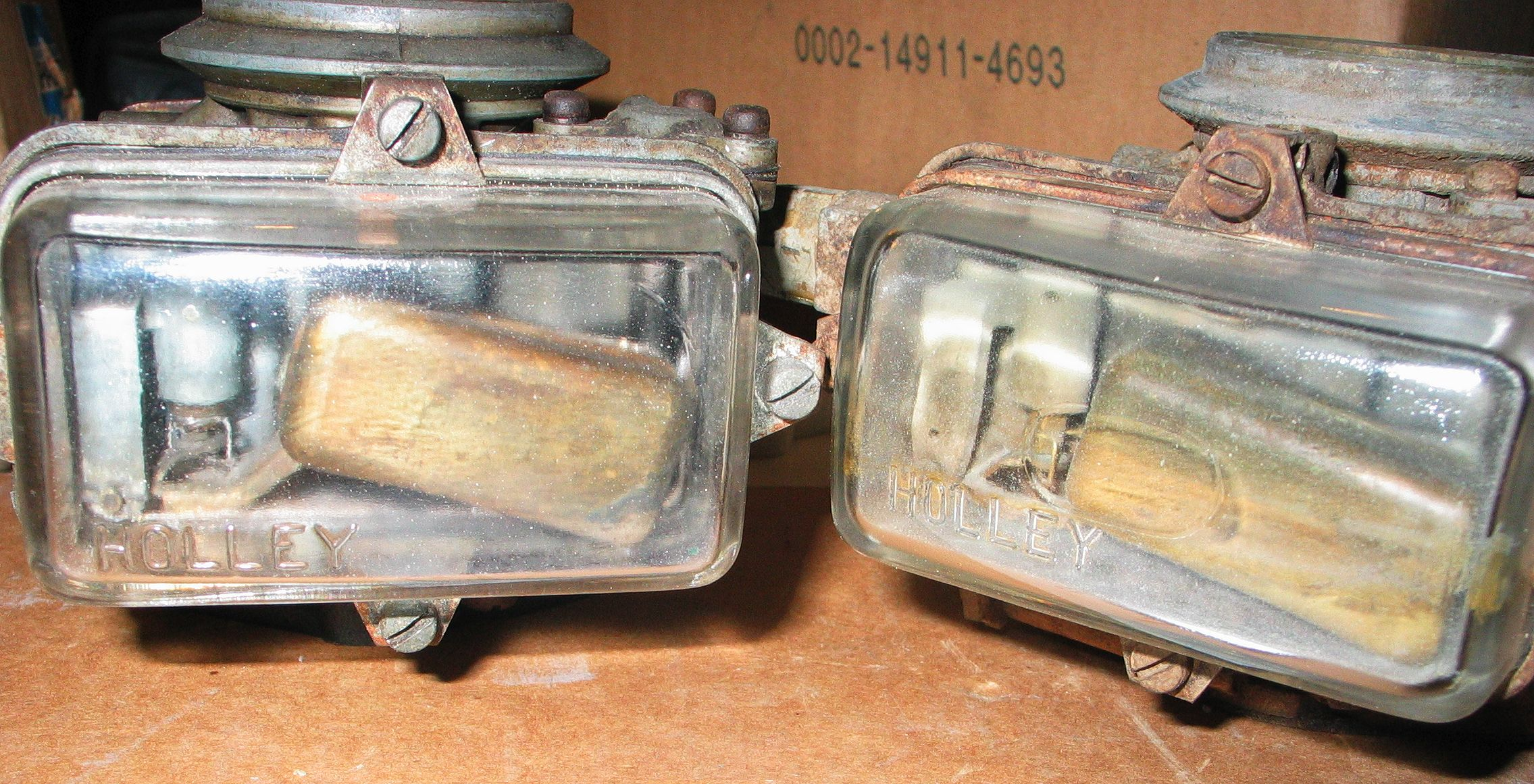
Holley "Visi-Flo" model #1904 carburetors from the 1950s, factory equipped with transparent glass bowls

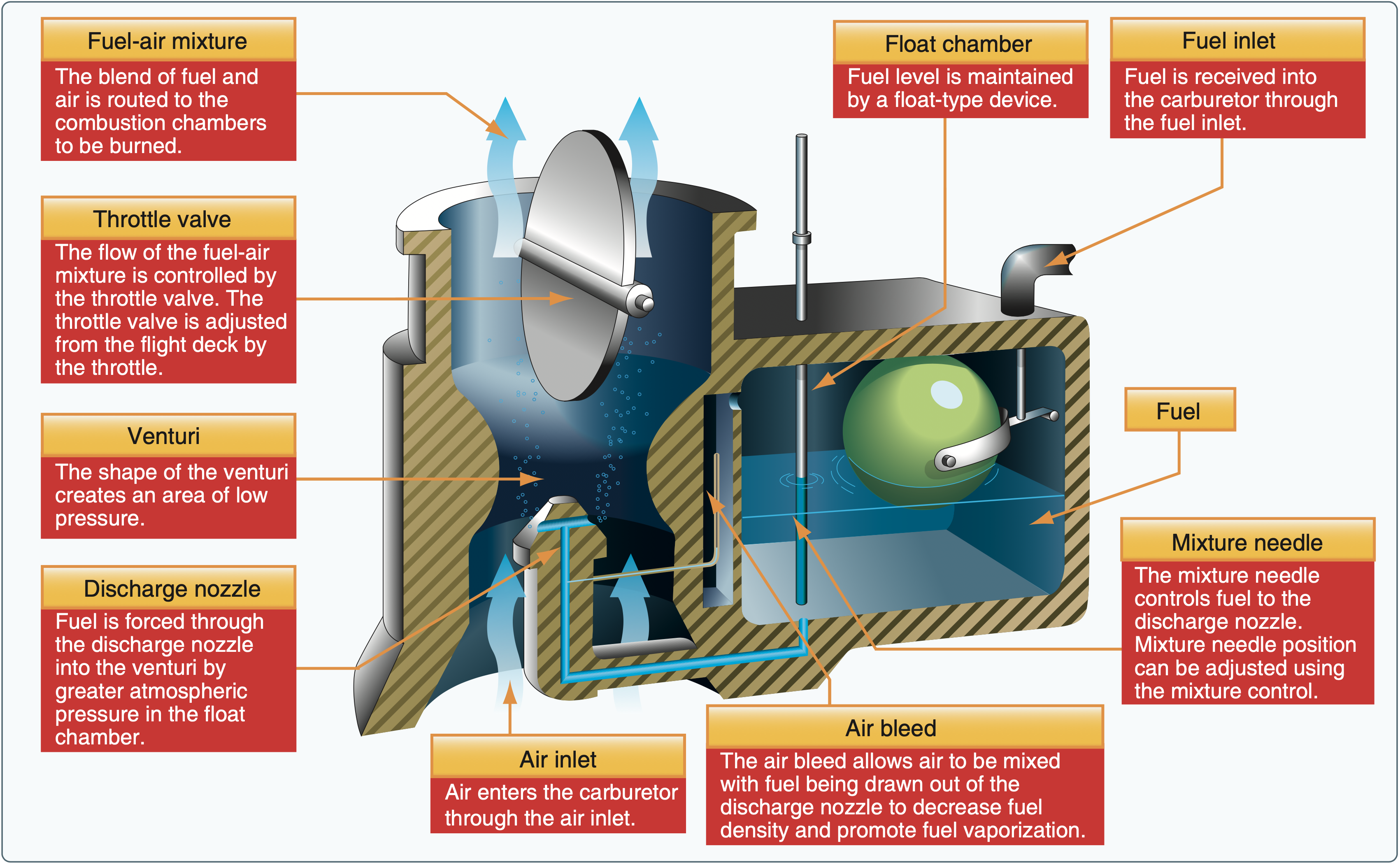
A float-type carburetor used in airplanes

In order to ensure an adequate supply at all times, carburetors include a reservoir of fuel, called a "float chamber" or "float bowl". Fuel is delivered to the float chamber by a fuel pump or by gravity with the fuel tank located higher than the carburetor. A floating inlet valve regulates the fuel entering the float chamber, assuring a constant level. In some small engines that may instead of a float chamber just use a fuel tank close below the carburetor and use the fuel suction to supply the fuel.

Unlike in a fuel injected engine, the fuel system in a carbureted engine is not pressurized. For engines where the intake air travelling through the carburetor is pressurized (such as where the carburetor is downstream of a supercharger) the entire carburetor must be contained in an airtight pressurized box to operate. However, this is not necessary where the carburetor is upstream of the supercharger.

Problems of fuel boiling and vapor lock can occur in carbureted engines, especially in hotter climates. Since the float chamber is located close to the engine, heat from the engine (including for several hours after the engine is shut off) can cause the fuel to heat up to the point of vaporization. This causes air bubbles in the fuel (similar to the air bubbles that necessitate brake bleeding), which prevents the flow of fuel and is known as 'vapor lock'.

When a carburetor uses the Bernoulli principle there is a vent from the float chamber to ambient air and it prevents the fuel from over-pressuring and allows for fuel/air correction at changes in ambient air pressure, and in carburetors with a Venturi, and with a Pitot tube, each vent goes to the air entry flow for the same benefits.

=== Diaphragm chamber ===
If an engine must be operated when the carburetor is not in an upright orientation (for example in a chainsaw or airplane), a float chamber and gravity activated float valve would not be suitable. Instead, a diaphragm chamber is typically used. This consists of a flexible diaphragm on one side of the fuel chamber, connected to a needle valve which regulates the fuel entering the chamber. As the flowrate of the air in the chamber (controlled by the throttling valve/butterfly valve) decreases, the diaphragm moves inward (downward), which closes the needle valve to admit less fuel. As the flowrate of the air in the chamber increases, the diaphragm moves outward (upward) which opens the needle valve to admit more fuel, allowing the engine to generate more power. A balanced state is reached which creates a steady fuel reservoir level, that remains constant in any orientation.

== Other components ==
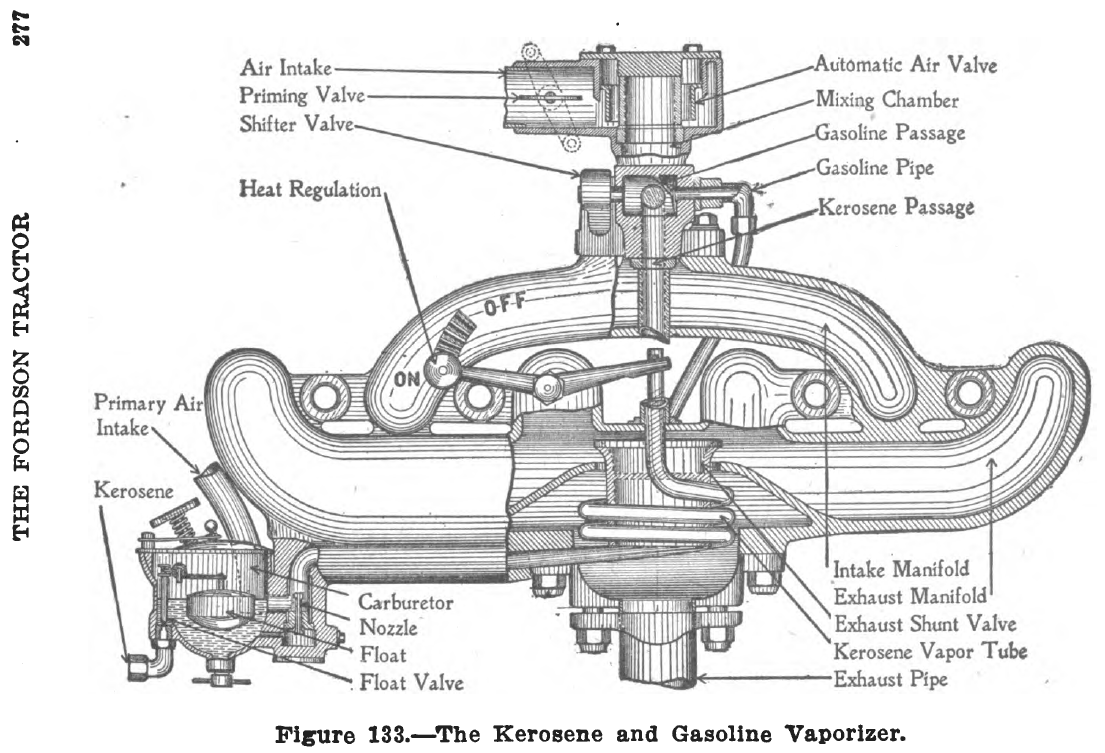
Fordson tractor vaporizer - cutaway view

Other components that have been used on carburetors include:

- Air bleeds allowing air into various portions of the fuel passages, to premix air and fuel, and minimise vaporization, and to largely correct air/fuel ratio over a large range, typically referred to as the emulsion system.
- Fuel flow restrictors in aircraft engines, to prevent fuel starvation during inverted flight.
- Heated vaporizers to assist with the atomization of the fuel, particularly for engines using kerosene, tractor vaporizing oil or in petrol-paraffin engines
- Early fuel evaporators
- Feedback carburetors, which adjusted the fuel/air mixture in response to signals from an oxygen sensor, in order to allow a catalytic converter to be used
- Constant vacuum carburetors (also called variable choke carburetors), whereby the throttle cable is connected directly to the throttle cable plate. Pulling the cord caused raw gasoline to enter the carburetor, creating a large emission of hydrocarbons.
- Constant velocity carburetors use a variable opening in the intake air stream after movement of the throttle plate from the accelerator pedal. This variable opening is controlled by pressure/vacuum at the variable opening itself. This pressure-controlled opening provides relatively even intake pressure throughout the engine's speed and load ranges.

== Two-barrel and four-barrel designs ==
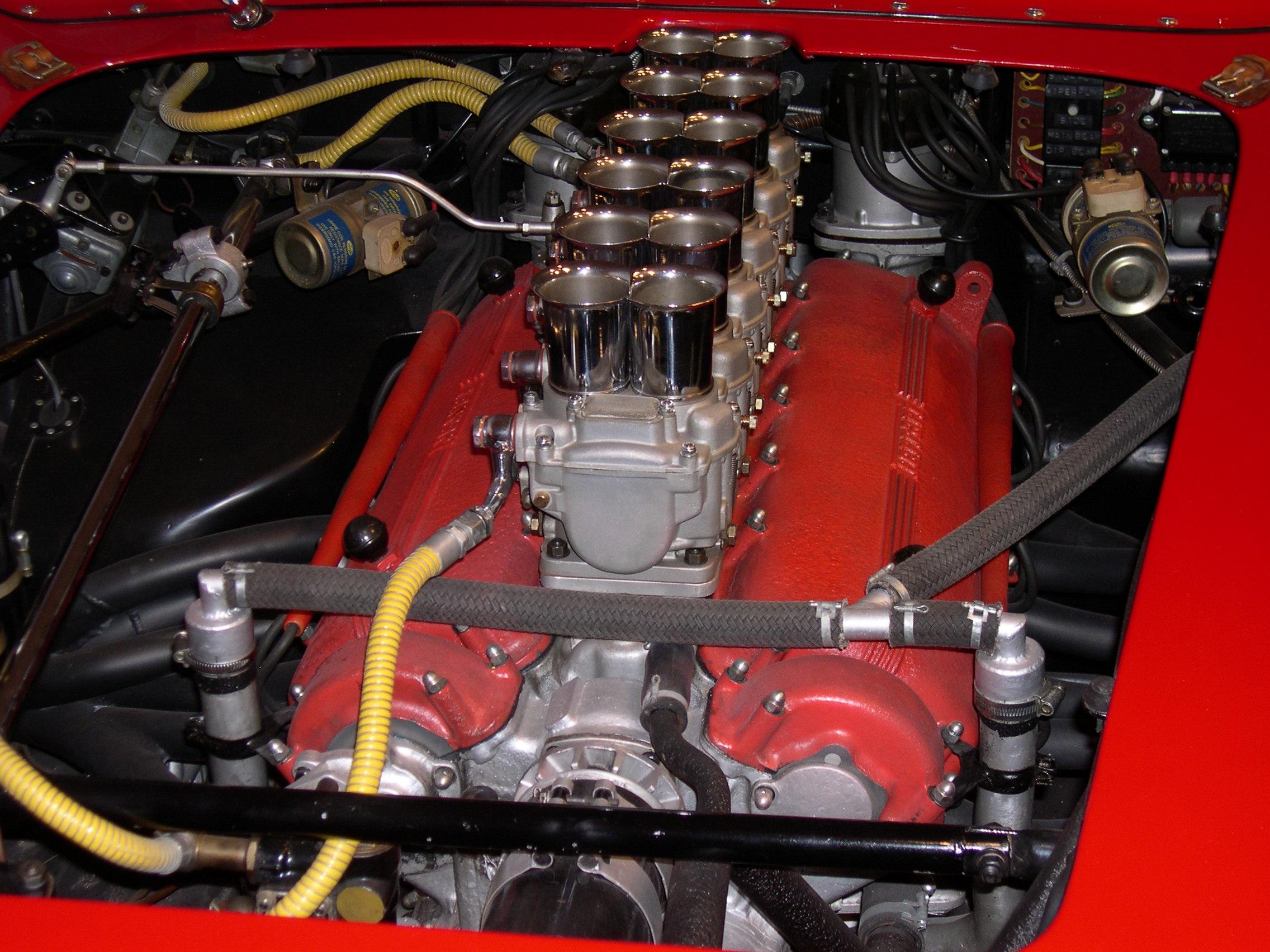
Six two-barrel Weber carburetors on a Ferrari Colombo V12

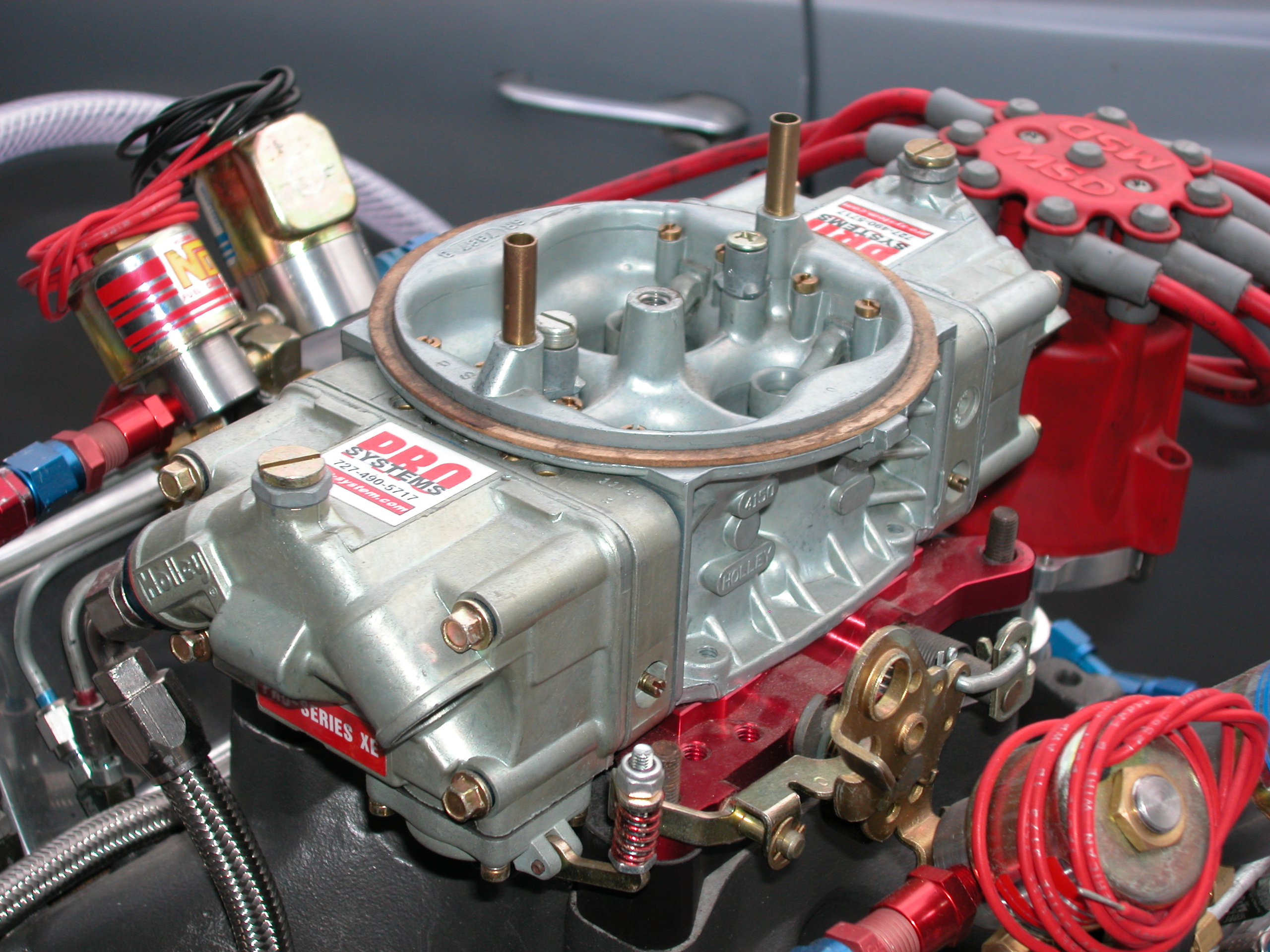
High-performance four-barrel Holley 4150 carburetor

The basic design for a carburetor consists of a single venturi (main metering circuit), though designs with two or four venturi (two-barrel and four-barrel carburetors respectively) are also quite commonplace. Typically the barrels consist of "primary" barrel(s) used for lower load situations and secondary barrel(s) activating when required to provide additional air/fuel at higher loads. The primary and secondary venturi are often sized differently and incorporate different features to suit the situations in which they are used.

Many four-barrel carburetors use two primary and two secondary barrels. A four-barrel design of two primary and two secondary barrels was commonly used in V8 engines to conserve fuel at low engine speeds while still affording an adequate supply at high.

The use of multiple carburetors (e.g., a carburetor for each cylinder or pair of cylinders) also results in the intake air being drawn through multiple venturi. Some high-performance engines have used multiple two-barrel or four-barrel carburetors, for example six two-barrel carburetors on Ferrari V12s.

== History ==
In 1826, American engineer Samuel Morey received a patent for a "gas or vapor engine", which had a carburetor that mixed turpentine and air. The design did not reach production. In 1888/1889 German engineer Siegfried Marcus produced a car powered by a petrol engine (which also debuted the first magneto ignition system). Karl Benz introduced his single-cylinder four-stroke powered Benz Patent-Motorwagen in 1885.

All three of these engines used surface carburetors, which operated by moving air across the top of a vessel containing the fuel.

The first float-fed carburetor design, which used an atomizer nozzle, was introduced by German engineers Wilhelm Maybach and Gottlieb Daimler in their 1885 Grandfather Clock engine. The Butler Petrol Cycle car—built in England in 1888—also used a float-fed carburetor. In 1892 Maybach produced an important carburetor with a jet spraying into a venturi, as would become the norm; this was patented in 1893.

The first carburetor for a stationary engine was patented in 1893 by Hungarian engineers János Csonka and Donát Bánki.

The first four-barrel carburetors were the Carter Carburetor WCFB and the identical Rochester 4GC, introduced in various General Motors models for 1952. Oldsmobile referred the new carburetor as the "Quadri-Jet" (original spelling) while Buick called it the "Airpower".

In the United States, carburetors were the common method of fuel delivery for most US-made gasoline (petrol) engines until the late 1980s, when fuel injection became the preferred method. One of the last motorsport users of carburetors was NASCAR, which switched to electronic fuel injection after the 2011 Sprint Cup series. NASCAR still uses the four-barrel carburetor in the NASCAR Xfinity Series.

In Europe, carburetors were largely replaced by fuel injection in the late 1980s, although fuel injection had been increasingly used in luxury cars and sports cars since the 1970s. EEC legislation required all vehicles sold and produced in member countries to have a catalytic converter after December 1992. This legislation had been in the pipeline for some time, with many cars becoming available with catalytic converters or fuel injection from around 1990.

== Icing in aircraft engine carburetors ==
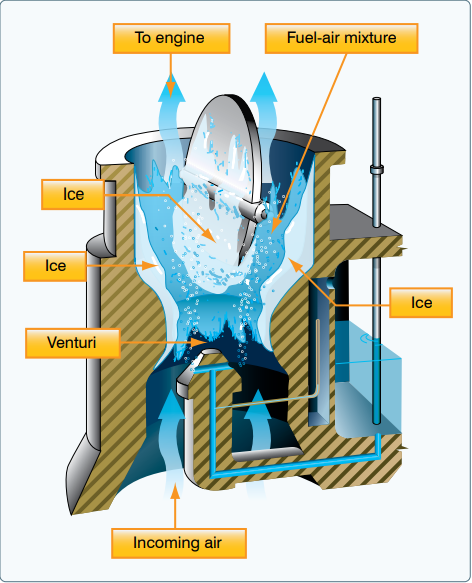
The formation of carburetor ice may reduce or block fuel-air flow to the engine

A significant concern for aircraft engines is the formation of ice inside the carburetor. The temperature of air within the carburetor can be reduced by up to 40 °C (72 °F), due to a combination of the reduced air pressure in the venturi and the latent heat of the evaporating fuel. The conditions during the descent to landing are particularly conducive to icing, since the engine is run at idle for a prolonged period with the throttle closed. Icing can also occur in cruise conditions at altitude.

A carburetor heat system is often used to prevent icing. This system consists of a secondary air intake which passes around the exhaust, in order to heat the air before it enters the carburetor. Typically, the system is operated by the pilot manually switching the intake air to travel via the heated intake path as required. The carburetor heat system reduces the power output (due to the lower density of heated air) and causes the intake air filter to be bypassed, therefore the system is only used when there is a risk of icing.

If the engine is operating at idle RPM, another method to prevent icing is to periodically open the throttle, which increases the air temperature within the carburetor.

Carburetor icing also occurs on other applications and various methods have been employed to solve this problem. On inline engines the intake and exhaust manifolds are on the same side of the head. Heat from the exhaust is used to warm the intake manifold and in turn the carburetor. On V configurations, exhaust gases were directed from one head through the intake cross over to the other head. One method for regulating the exhaust flow on the cross over for intake warming was a weighted eccentric butterfly valve called a heat riser that remained closed at idle and opened at higher exhaust flow. Some vehicles used a heat stove around the exhaust manifold. It was connected to the air filter intake via tubing and supplied warmed air to the air filter. A vacuum controlled butterfly valve pre heat tube on the intake horn of the air cleaner would open allowing cooler air when engine load increased.

== See also ==
- Bernoulli's principle
- Fuel injection
- Humidifier
- List of auto parts
- List of carburetor manufacturers
- Venturi effect
