= History of vehicle registration plates of the Philippines =

Philippine vehicle registration plates have a long history. The earliest license plates were introduced around 1912 with the introduction of Legislative Act No. 2159.

In this article, "L" stands for a letter in 1974–1980 and 1981 series plates, "X" stands for an alphanumeric symbol (in 1974–1980 license plates), "P" stands for a prefix (in 1933–1980 license plates), and "D" stands for a number (in all license plates).

== Specifications ==
=== Early license plates ===
Most early license plates just showed the serial number, most likely a 4 to 5-digit number and a small box on the left of the serial number which displays the 2-digit year mark, which is written downwards. This continued until 1932.

e.g. 31 44789, 31 stands for the year 1931

=== 1933 series ===
With the Revised Motor Vehicle Law (Act No. 3992) introduced in 1933, second-generation Philippine license plates were introduced; they can be in the format of "A-B" or "P-B", where A is an area code number (used until 1960), P is a vehicle classification prefix, and B is a 3 to 6-digit number. Sometimes single-letter suffixes were used.

Hyphens were used in separating the numbers; this was later replaced by asterisks in 1938. On the bottom of the license plate are the 2-digit year mark, the place the car is registered, and the word "P.I.", in that order (e.g. "36 MANILA P.I.", 36 stands for 1936). In 1938 the "P.I." was dropped, the place name and the year mark were simply displayed (e.g. MANILA 60, 60 stands for 1960). Prefixes were common in license plates starting in 1938. Sometimes prefixes stand for place names (e.g. "PS" stands for Pasay).

- 1934 – white symbols on green background
  - For government vehicles, the plate has a shield outline with the 2-digit year mark (sometimes written downward) inside it, then the word "P.I." below, then a 2 or 3-digit number on the right of the shield outline, and then the word "PHILIPPINES" on the bottom of the license plate.
- 1935 – yellow symbols on a black background with the original (1933) numbering format
- 1936 – red symbols on a white background with original numbering format
- 1937 – white symbols on dark blue background
- 1938 – green symbols on a white background with a revised numbering format and bottom text.
  - Instead of "(year) (place) P.I.", the bottom text is displayed as "(place) (year)", sometimes with an asterisk or hyphen dividing the words. Prefixes on license plates came into use.
- 1939 – black symbols on white background with second numbering format
- 1940 – red symbols on a yellow background with the second numbering format
- 1941 – yellow symbols on blue background with the second numbering format
- 1942 – white symbols on a black background
  - Manila license plates omit the "1" prefix from this point on.
- 1944 – white on red
- 1945 – yellow on green
- 1946 – dark blue symbols on a yellow-orange background
  - On some license plates, there were two-year markers (e.g. 46*PHILIPPINES*46).
- 1947 – same format as 1936 license plates ( red on white ) but with 2nd (1938) numbering format
- 1948 – black symbols on pink background
- 1949 – white on red
- 1950 – white symbols on a green background
  - Typeface was slightly changed and a new numbering format was used. On license plates with two numbers, the left number is smaller than the right number.
  - Motorcycle plates now have the prefix of "MC".
- 1951 – yellow symbols on a dark brown background
- 1952 – white symbols on a dark blue background
- 1953 – white symbols on red background
- 1954 – white symbols on green background (similar to 1950 license plates)
- 1955 – same format as 1942 license plates ( white on black ) but with the 3rd (1950) numbering format
  - Diplomatic plates for that year were black on white .
- 1956 – same format as 1953 license plates ( white on red )
  - Starting that year, the font on the bottom of the license plates has been slightly modified.
- 1957 – same format as 1952 plates ( white on dark blue )
- 1958 – white symbols on maroon background
- 1959 – white symbols on orange background
- 1960 – white symbols on green background (same format as 1950 and 1954 plates)
- 1961 – a new numbering format and color set has been used. Above the serial number is "RIZAL'S CENTENARY YEAR", and on the right of the plate is a decal depicting the Rizal Monument.
  - Standard format (B, E, H, J, L, MC, T, TR, etc.) – white symbols on red-orange background
  - Public transport (PUB, PUJ, TX)- white symbols on black background
  - Government use (RP series)- white symbols on black background
  - Rental vehicle (U) – white on maroon
- 1962
  - Standard format – white symbols on maroon background
  - Public transport – white symbols on blue background
  - Government use – white symbols on orange background
  - Service vehicle (S) – white on turquoise
  - Unusual variant(s) – yellow symbols on red background
- 1963
  - Standard format – white symbols on green background
  - Public transport – white symbols on red background
  - Government use – white on orange
  - Service vehicle – white on black
  - Rental vehicle – white on red
  - Unusual variant(s) – yellow symbols on gray background
- 1964 – the text above the serial number reads "MABINI CENTENNIAL"
  - Standard format – white symbols on blue background
  - Public transport- white on black
  - Government use – white on black
  - Service vehicle – white on blue
  - Rental vehicle – white on black
  - Unusual variant(s) – yellow symbols on gray background
- 1965 – the text above the serial number reads "CHRISTIANIZATION'S 4TH CENTENNIAL"
  - Standard format – white symbols on orange background
  - Government use – white on black
- 1966
  - Standard format – blue symbols on white background
  - Public transport – black on yellow
  - Pickup truck (AC) – black on yellow
  - Diplomatic use (DC, CC, etc.) – white on blue
- 1967
  - Instead of new color schemes for the years 1967–1969, date tabs (with a 2-digit year marker) were inserted on the lower-right corner of a 1966-subseries plate. The use of these tabs continued until 1969.

=== 1970 series ===
In 1970, Philippine vehicle license plates adapted a numbering format similar to Japanese license plates. It can be in a format of "DD-DD", (from 0–0 to 99–99, sometimes 00 to 09 are used) with single or double-letter suffixes. Most vehicle category prefixes are on the lower-left of the plate. For government vehicles, "RP" is displayed before the number. Year stickers were introduced in 1973.

=== 1974 series ===
A new license plate format was introduced for the year 1974. The format is "L DDD", "DDD L", "XX DDD" or "DDD XX", with the vehicle classification at the lower-left corner of the plate, followed by the place name (which was changed to "PILIPINAS" in 1977), and the 2-digit year marker. The initial typeface resembles the 1970 series plates. (e.g. G 582, 159 F, FE 358, 576 NK)

- 1977
  - The typeface and color schemes were changed.
- 1980
  - The color schemes were changed again.

=== 1981 series ===
In 1981, the vehicle registration plate system has been revised again, taking the format of LLL-DDD. Color-coded year stickers appear for the first time in 1982, based on the license plate's color scheme (notable exceptions are in 1983, 1984, 1986, 1988, 1989, 1990 and 1993). Stickers for vehicle classification appeared in the same year. The byline at the bottom of the plate was displayed as "PILIPINAS" ("Philippines"). Later then in some yellow and government (Rizal Monument) plates, the byline's font was clear and it was also displayed as "PILIPINAS" except to its font and kerning, where the characters were condensed kerning and with wide glyphs.

One of the biggest changes of this design was the font. It was based on military-grade letterings (such as the MV Freedom Star nameplate), UK license plate fonts and are proprietary for government use. For example, the letterforms of this font like the letters C, G, T, V, Z and L, have similarities except there are some subtle modifications. Letters with middle horizontal lines like B, F, E, H, P, R and S have a slight up than dead center (middle). Numbers with middle lines like 3, 5, 6, 8, 9 had also a slight up when compared with the latter. Letters that had middle intersecting lines, middle horizontal lines and midpoints like letters K and W have also slight-ups similar to those middle line changes that mentioned earlier. All middle horizontal lines and midpoints has to be consistent and to be slightly up from the middle. Additionally, number 2 and 7 have subtle modifications. Unlike the pre-1981 and post-2000 plate series whereas the font changes over time, this font is a monospaced, sans-serif and military-grade but it is considered vulnerable since there is a chance of alteration such as fraud and glyph substitution (ex. P→R, S→8, 5→8, C→0, etc.) and designed to fit in a wide plate.

In 2002, the font weight has been changed for private vehicles (Matatag Na Republika plate series), while the 1981 font remains for other vehicles and PUVs. It is thinned and condensed form and more squarish than the 1981 font series by looking its loops.

Diamond shape, specifically a lozenge (U+2B2A ⬪ BLACK SMALL LOZENGE) was used as a separator between the letter block and the numbers.

- 1988
  - The license plates are slightly redesigned.
    - Sometimes, an "F" between the "LLL-DDD" serial number indicates a front plate; an "R" indicates a rear plate.
    - Public transport plates are usually displayed as yellow symbols on a black background (front and rear plates).
    - For other license plates, the rear plates have the inverted colors of the front plates.
- 1994
  - The license plates have slightly reverted to the 1981 format; in 1995, most license plates had started the byline displayed as "PHILIPPINES 2000".
- 2000
  - Most license plates have the byline displayed as "Angat Pinoy 2004" ("Raising Philippines 2004"), "PILIPINAS", or "PERLAS NG SILANGAN" ("Pearl of the East").
- 2002
  - The license plates were completely redesigned, with the background being a blue/white/green gradient with a picture of the Rizal Monument in the center.
  - Most license plates have the byline displayed as "MATATAG NA REPUBLIKA" ("Strong Republic"); a few have it displayed as "PILIPINAS" or "PERLAS NG SILANGAN".
  - Some public transport license plates have a blue/yellow/green gradient background with the Rizal Monument picture in the center (mostly with 2002 subseries letterings) or a golden yellow background with the lettering similar to 1987 subseries license plates.
- 2005
  - 3-year validation stickers appear for the first time.
- 2009
  - For NCR Plates, The letters, "I","O" & "Q", will display either in the middle or end.

=== 2014 series ===
In January 2013, Land Transportation Office ventures the plate standardization project that will redesign the plates and will include new security features, regions will now be indicated at the bottom of the plate number with a bar code at the top left of the plate. The color of the new plate is changed to black on white with the new format LLL-DDDD for light motor vehicles and LL-DDDDD for motorcycles.

- 2014
  - New plate released for government vehicles, motorcycles, and tricycles. Government vehicles will still follow the plate series format, and the first letter will start with "S" in red characters on a white background with regions indicated at the bottom of the plate.
  - New plate released for diplomatic vehicles. DDDD and DDDDD plate format, 4-digit diplomatic plates with blue numbers on a white background are in embassy use, while 5-digit diplomatic license plates with black numbers on a blue background are in diplomat use.
  - New white plate released for vehicles registered 2013 and below, replacing the old green plates for every vehicle.
- 2017
  - New registration conduction sticker format released: L-D-L-DDD for new vehicles.

=== 2018 series ===
In July 2018, the Land Transportation Office released a newly updated plate simplifying the 2014 series. The new font of the plate is FE-Schrift. The plate no longer indicates the region below it, instead, the first prefix of the plate will indicate the region of where the vehicle is registered, bringing back the 1981 license plate series alphabetical designation. At the right bottom of the plate is where the small QR code is located.

- 2020
  - New larger motorcycle plates with a DDD-LLL format were released in 2020 for the 2018 series plates. The plate consists of color-coded strip with a QR code in the middle, every color and whether the position of the strip is at the top or bottom of the plate will indicate the region where it is registered.
- 2021
  - New government plate released with updated features following the current series for 2016 to 2019 registered vehicles.
- 2022
  - New diplomatic plates released for foreign diplomats assigned in the Philippines. Diplomatic plate format DDD-DDDD in blue characters on a white background, the first 3 digits of the plate will indicate the assigned number of the country, and international organizations that are based in the Philippines. The next 4 digits of the plate are randomized registration digits and are assigned by the LTO and DFA, however, the 1000 number will always be assigned and reserved for the ambassadors.
- 2023
  - New plate format released: L-DDD-LL for motorcycles and tricycles.
  - New registration conduction sticker format released: LL-DDD-L for new vehicles.
  - New plate released with updated features following the current series for all old green plate registered vehicles.
  - 3-year Registration for brand new Motorcycles below 200cc.
  - New plate released for Electric and Hybrid vehicles. The plate consists of a green color code scheme on a white background with a new letter combination. Electric vehicle plates second letter will be from A to M, while the third letter will be the following; V W X Y Z. Hybrid vehicle plates second letter will be from N to Z, while the third letter will be the following; V W X Y Z.
  - New letter combination released TX, TY, and TZ for vintage vehicle plates and will contain the words "Vintage Vehicle" and vehicle year model at the bottom of the plate.
- 2024
  - New plate format released for government vehicles. Government vehicle plates second letter will indicate the region of where the government vehicle is registered following the current region prefixes.
  - New plate released for government motorcycles and tricycles. The plate will still follow the current format of motorcycle and tricycle plates, and will follow the government format that the first letter will start with "S".
  - New plate format released: L-DDDD-L for motorcycles and tricycles for 2017 and below, and the current series plates.
- 2025
  - New plates released for Trailer vehicles registered from 2016–present, the second letter is "U".
  - New plate formats released: LL-DDD-L, D-LLL-DD, and L-D-L-DDD for motorcycles and tricycles for 2017 and below, and the current series plates.
  - New plate formats for yellow plates for tricycles were released: LL-DDDD and D-LL-DDD.
  - Standardization of every motor vehicle plates. Changing the old green plates to white plates for vehicles, motorcycles, and tricycles.
- 2026
  - 5 year Registration for Brand New Vehicles and Motorcycles on February 15
  - Conduction Sticker is now LL DDD format
  - Replacement Yellow plate formats (LLL-DDD) were released for PUV vehicles

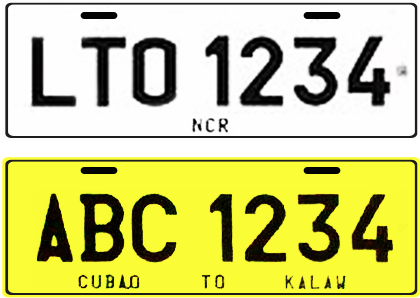
An example design of a 2014 series vehicle registration plate; Plate for private and light vehicles (Top) and for Public Utility vehicles (Bottom).

== Lists of prefixes ==
In 1938, prefixes were common on license plates. Prefixes can be combined (e.g. RPTR, which denotes a government-owned trailer). Most of the prefixes took the form of stickers starting in 1981.

=== Vehicle category prefixes ===
- A – Agent (dealer)
- AC – auto calesa jeepney
- B – "bantam" / kei car
- CC – diplomatic vehicle (from "consular corps")
- CD – diplomatic vehicle (from French "Corps Diplomatique")
- CM – Chief of Mission's (ambassador's) vehicle
- DC – diplomatic vehicle (from "diplomatic corps")
- DD – diplomatic vehicle
- DPL – diplomatic vehicle
- E – tax-exempt vehicle
- G – garage (dealer)
- H – heavy vehicle (with large engine displacement of 2801 cc and over)
- J – jeep
- L – light vehicle (with small engine displacement of 1600 cc or less )
- M – medium vehicle (with medium engine displacement of 1601 – 2800 cc)
- MC – motorcycle
- MCH – motorcycle for hire
- N – SUV's
- OEV – other exempt vehicle
- PI – government use (from Philippine Islands)
- PU – public transport (PUB stands for "public utility bus"; it should not be confused with the B prefix which stands for a bantam car)
- PUB – public utility bus
- PUJ – public utility jeepney
- R – Rental Vehicle
- RP – government vehicle (from Republika ng Pilipinas or Republic of the Philippines)
- S – service van or bus
- SPL – special designation
- T – truck
- TB – tour bus
- TC (1942) – cargo truck
- TC – tricycle
- TEMP/TMP – temporary
- TH – truck for hire
- TX/TAXI – taxicab
- TR – trailer
- TRJ – jeep trailer
- TRLB – Truck
- U – Undertaker (funeral vehicle)/Hearse
- UV – utility vehicle (also includes sport-utility vehicles and vans)

=== Place prefixes ===
==== 1981 series ====
- A – Ilocos Region and Cordillera Administrative Region – (1981–2014); (2000–2014)
- B – Cagayan Valley – (1981–2014)
- C – Central Luzon – (1981–2003)
- D – Calabarzon and Mimaropa – (1981–1999)
- E – Bicol Region – (1981–2014)
- F – Western Visayas – (1981–2014)
- G – Central Visayas – (1981–2004)
- H – Eastern Visayas – (1981–2014)
- J – Zamboanga Peninsula and Bangsamoro Autonomous Region in Muslim Mindanao – (1981–2014)
- K – Northern Mindanao – (1981–2014)
- L – Davao Region and Caraga – (1981–2014); (2000–2014)
- M – Soccsksargen- (1981–2014)
- N – National Capital Region – (1981–1985); (2009–2010)
- P – National Capital Region – (1985–1991); (2010–2011)
- R – Central Luzon – (2003–2014)
- S – Government-owned Vehicles
- T – National Capital Region – (1991–1995); (2011–2012)
- U – National Capital Region – (1995–1997); (2012–2013)
- V – Calabarzon and Mimaropa – (1999–2014)
- W – National Capital Region – (1997–2001); (2013–2014)
- X – National Capital Region – (2001–2005)
- Y – Central Visayas – (2004–2014)
- Z – National Capital Region – (2005–2009)

The letters I & O were not used to avoid confusion with the digits 1 & 0, but initially used for private motorcycles only.
Q in that series was a special letter and that was used only for motorcycles or tricycles for hire.
However these letters had been in use as middle, last letter positions or both for plates registered in Metro Manila since 2009 (e.g. NOA-123, PQI-456) and Central Visayas in mid-2010 (e.g. YJO-123, YJQ-456; only letters O and Q). These letters in any position are now being used for all plates registered nationwide since 2014.

==== 2014 series ====
From April 13, 2014, to June 30, 2016, the plate number letters are all the same throughout the Philippines in a series and combination, since the region where it is registered is now displayed in the new license plates at the bottom part.

- AA(A, H-Q, W-Z); A(B-L, O-T, V)A; AB(B-H, O-T) – National Capital Region
- AA(A, R-S, U); A(L, V)A; ABI – Ilocos Region
- AA(K, U); ADA; ABN – Cordillera Administrative Region
- AA(A, T); A(E, L, V)A; ABI – Cagayan Valley
- AA(B, Q-R, T-V); A(F, L-M, V-W)A; AB(B, I-K) – Central Luzon
- AA(B-D, V-W); A(E, W-X)A; AB(B, L) – Calabarzon
- AAD; ABK - Mimaropa
- AA(D, R); A(B, F-G, M, X)A; ABL – Bicol Region
- AA(D, R); A(B, G, M-N, X)A; ABM – Western Visayas
- AA(D-F, Z); A(F, X)A; AB(M-N) – Central Visayas
- AA(F, W); A(B, F)A; ABN – Eastern Visayas
- AA(F, R, T); A(F, N, X)A; ABU – Zamboanga Peninsula and Bangsamoro Autonomous Region in Muslim Mindanao
- AA(F, R-S, U); A(F, N)A; AB(B-C) – Northern Mindanao
- AA(F-H)- Davao Region
- AA(H, S-U); A(B, G, N-O)A; AB(U-V) – Soccsksargen
- AA(L, U); A(D, F)A; ABB – Caraga

==== 2018 series ====
Registered vehicles since July 1, 2016 have the same alphabetical designation similar to 1981 license plate series, with some changes.

- A – Ilocos Region (motorcycles only)
- B – Cagayan Valley
- C – Central Luzon
- D – Calabarzon
- E – Bicol Region
- F – Western Visayas
- G – Central Visayas
- H – Eastern Visayas
- I – Ilocos Region
- J – Zamboanga Peninsula and Bangsamoro Autonomous Region in Muslim Mindanao
- K – Northern Mindanao
- L – Davao Region
- M – Soccsksargen
- N – National Capital Region
- O – Calabarzon (motorcycles only)
- P – National Capital Region
- Q – National Capital Region
- R – Central Luzon
- S – Government-owned Vehicles
- T – National Capital Region
- U – National Capital Region
- V – Mimaropa
- W – Central Luzon (motorcycles only)
- X – National Capital Region
- Y – Cordillera Administrative Region
- Z – Caraga

== Regional issued plates (1981 series) ==
Pattern	Class	Notes
ABC-123 ABC-123 (rear only from 1988 to 1994)	Private vehicles	Private cars or light trucks, not for commercial uses
PUV-123 PUV-123 (from 1992 to 1995)	Public utility vehicles	Public utility cars (AUVs, jeepneys, taxicabs and school buses)
GOV-123 GOV-123 (rear only from 1989 to 1995)	Government vehicles	Cars for official government use
10000 10000 (from 1989 to 1995)	Diplomatic vehicles	Other exempted vehicles
GOB-123 GOB-123 (rear only from 1989 to 1995)	Official bus	Buses for government use

=== Metro Manila ===
Private (plate series with approximate year issued):

Year	Series issued
1981	NAA-NAH, NAJ-NAN, NAP, NAR-NAZ, NBA-NBH, NBJ-NBN, NBP, NBR-NBZ, NCA-NCH, NCJ-NCN, NCP, NCR-NCZ, NDA-NDH
1982	NDJ-NDN, NDP, NDR-NDZ, NEA-NEH, NEJ-NEN, NEP, NER-NEZ, NFA-NFH, NFJ-NFN, NFP, NFR-NFZ, NGA-NGH, NGJ-NGN, NGP, NGR-NGZ, NHA-NHH, NHJ-NHN, NHP, NHR-NHZ, NJA-NJH
1983	NJJ-NJN, NJP, NJR-NJZ, NKA-NKH, NKJ-NKN, NKP, NKR-NKZ, NLA-NLH, NLJ-NLN, NLP, NLR-NLZ, NMA-NMH, NMJ-NMN, NMP, NMR-NMZ, NNA-NNH, NNJ-NNN
1984	NNP, NNR-NNZ, NPA-NPH, NPJ-NPN, NPP, NPR-NPZ, NRA-NRH, NRJ-NRN, NRP, NRR-NRZ, NSA-NSH, NSJ-NSN, NSP, NSR-NSZ, NTA-NTH, NTJ-NTN
1985	NTP, NTR-NTZ; Those series were issued during the year not just to new vehicles but also to replace all pre-permanent plates registered at the time. PAA-PAH, PAJ-PAN, PAP, PAR-PAZ, PBA-PBH, PBJ-PBN, PBP, PBR-PBZ, PCA-PCH, PCJ-PCN
1986	PCP, PCR-PCZ, PDA-PDH, PDJ-PDN, PDP, PDR-PDZ, PEA-PEH, PEJ-PEN
1987	PEP, PER-PEZ, PFA-PFH, PFJ-PFN, PFP, PFR-PFZ, PGA-PGH, PGJ-PGN, PGP, PGR-PGZ, PHA-PHH, PHJ-PHN
1988	PHP, PHR-PHZ, PJA-PJH PJJ-PJN, PJP, PJR-PJZ, PKA-PKH, PKJ-PKN, PKP, PKR-PKZ, PLA-PLH, PLJ-PLN
1989	PLP, PLR-PLZ, PMA-PMH, PMJ-PMN, PMP, PMR-PMZ, PNA-PNH, PNJ-PNN, PNP, PNR-PNZ, PPA-PPH, PPJ-PPN
1990	PPP, PPR-PPZ, PRA-PRH, PRJ-PRN, PRP, PRR-PRZ, PSA-PSH, PSJ-PSN, PSP, PSR-PSZ, PTA-PTH, PTJ-PTN
1991	PTP, PTR-PTZ; TAA-TAH, TAJ-TAN, TAP, TAR-TAZ, TBA-TBH, TBJ-TBN, TBP, TBR-TBZ, TCA-TCH, TCJ-TCN
1992	TCP, TCR-TCZ, TDA-TDH, TDJ-TDN, TDP, TDR-TDZ, TEA-TEH, TEJ-TEN, TEP, TER-TEZ, TFA-TFH, TFJ-TFN
1993	TFP, TFR-TFZ, TGA-TGH, TGJ-TGN, TGP, TGR-TGZ, THA-THH, THJ-THN, THP, THR-THZ, TJA-TJH, TJJ-TJN, TJP, TJR-TJZ, TKA-TKH, TKJ-TKN, TKP, TKR-TKZ, TLA-TLH, TLJ-TLN
1994	TLP, TLR-TLZ, TMA-TMH, TMJ-TMN, TMP, TMR-TMZ, TNA-TNH, TNJ-TNN, TNP, TNR-TNZ, TPA-TPH, TPJ-TPN, TPP, TPR-TPZ, TRA-TRH, TRJ-TRN, TRP, TRR-TRZ, TTA-TTH, TTJ-TTN
1995	TTP, TTR-TTZ; UAA-UAB; (PILIPINAS series)
1995	TSA-TSH, TSJ-TSN, TSP, TSR-TSZ; UAC-UAH, UAJ-UAN, UAP, UAR-UAZ, UBA-UBH, UBJ-UBN, UBP, UBR-UBZ, UCA-UCH, UCJ-UCN, UCP, UCR-UCZ, UDA-UDH, UDJ-UDN, UDP, UDR-UDZ, UEA-UEH, UEJ-UEN (PHILIPPINES 2000 series)
1996	UEP, UER-UEZ, UFA-UFH, UFJ-UFN, UFP, UFR-UFZ, UGA-UGH, UGJ-UGN, UGP, UGR-UGZ, UHA-UHH, UHJ-UHN, UHP, UHR-UHZ, UJA-UJH, UJJ-UJN, UJP, UJR-UJZ, UKA-UKH, UKJ-UKN, UKP, UKR-UKZ, ULA-ULH, ULJ-ULN, ULP, ULR-ULZ, UMA-UMH, UMJ-UMN, UMP, UMR-UMZ, UNA-UNH, UNJ-UNN
1997	UNP, UNR-UNZ, UPA-UPH, UPJ-UPN, UPP, UPR-UPZ, URA-URH, URJ-URN, URP, URR-URZ, USA-USH, USJ-USN, USP, USR-USZ, UTA-UTH, UTJ-UTN, UTP, UTR-UTZ, UUA-UUH, UUJ-UUN, UUP, UUR-UUZ; WAA-WAH, WAJ-WAN, WAP, WAR-WAZ, WBA-WBH
1998	WBJ-WBN, WBP, WBR-WBZ WCA-WCH, WCJ-WCN, WCP, WCR-WCZ, WDA-WDH, WDJ-WDN, WDP, WDR-WDZ, WEA-WEH, WEJ-WEN, WEP, WER-WEZ, WFA-WFH, WFJ-WFN, WFP
1999	WFR-WFZ, WGA-WGH, WGJ-WGN, WGP, WGR-WGZ, WHA-WHH, WHJ-WHN, WHP, WHR-WHZ, WJA-WJH, WJJ-WJN, WJP, WJR-WJZ, WKA-WKH, WKJ-WKN, WKP, WKR-WKZ, WLA-WLH
2000	WLJ-WLN, WLP, WLR-WLZ, WMA-WMH, WMJ-WMN, WMP, WMR-WMZ, WNA-WNH, WNJ-WNN, WNP, WNR-WNZ (PHILIPPINES 2000 series)
2000	WPA-WPH, WPJ-WPN, WPP, WPR-WPZ, WRA-WRH, WRJ-WRN, WRP (ANGAT PINOY 2004 series)
2001	WRR-WRZ (ANGAT PINOY 2004 series)
2001	WSA-WSH, WSJ-WSN, WSP, WSR-WSZ, WTA-WTH, WTJ-WTN, WTP, WTR-WTZ; XAA-XAH, XAJ-XAN, XAP, XAR-XAZ, XBA-XBH (PILIPINAS series)
2002	XBJ-XBN, XBP, XBR-XBZ (PILIPINAS series)
2002	XCA-XCH, XCJ-XCN, XCP, XCR-XCZ, XDA-XDH, XDJ-XDN, XDP, XDR-XDZ (PERLAS NG SILANGAN series)
2002	XEA-XEH, XEJ-XEN, XEP, XER-XEZ, XFA-XFH, XFJ-XFN, XFP, XFR-XFZ, XGA-XGH, XGJ-XGN (PILIPINAS series)
2003	XGP, XGR-XGZ, XHA-XHH, XHJ-XHN, XHP, XHR-XHZ (PILIPINAS series)
2003	XJA-XJH, XJJ-XJN, XJP, XJR-XJZ, XKA-XKH, XKJ-XKN, XKP, XKR-XKZ, XLA-XLH, XLJ-XLN, XLP, XLR-XLZ, XMA-XMH (MATATAG NA REPUBLIKA series)
2004	XMJ-XMN, XMP, XMR-XMZ, XNA-XNH, XNJ-XNN, XNP, XNR-XNZ, XPA-XPH, XPJ-XPN, XPP, XPR-XPZ, XRA-XRH, XRJ-XRN, XRP, XRR-XRZ, XSA-XSH
2005	XSJ-XSN, XSP, XSR-XSZ, XTA-XTH, XTJ-XTN, XTP, XTR-XTZ; ZAA-ZAH, ZAJ-ZAN, ZAP, ZAR-ZAZ, ZBA-ZBH, ZBJ-ZBN, ZBP, ZBR-ZBZ, ZCA-ZCH
2006	ZCJ-ZCN, ZCP, ZCR-ZCZ, ZDA-ZDH, ZDJ-ZDN, ZDP, ZDR-ZDZ, ZEA-ZEH, ZEJ-ZEN, ZEP, ZER-ZEZ, ZFA-ZFH, ZFJ-ZFN, ZFP, ZFR-ZFZ, ZGA-ZGH
2007	ZGJ-ZGN, ZGP, ZGR-ZGZ, ZHA-ZHH, ZHJ-ZHN, ZHP, ZHR-ZHZ, ZJA-ZJH, ZJJ-ZJN, ZJP, ZJR-ZJZ, ZKA-ZKH, ZKJ-ZKN, ZKP, ZKR-ZKZ, ZLA-ZLH, ZLJ-ZLN
2008	ZLP, ZLR-ZLZ, ZMA-ZMH, ZMJ-ZMN, ZMP, ZMR-ZMZ, ZNA-ZNH, ZNJ-ZNN, ZNP, ZNR-ZNZ, ZPA-ZPH, ZPJ-ZPN, ZPP, ZPR-ZPZ, ZRA-ZRH, ZRJ-ZRN, ZRP, ZRR-ZRZ, ZSA-ZSH
2009	ZSJ-ZSN, ZSP, ZSR-ZSZ, ZTA-ZTH, ZTJ-ZTN, ZTP, ZTR-ZTZ; NAI-NZI; NAO-NZO; NAQ-NZQ; NIA-NIH, NIJ-NIN
2010	NIP, NIR-NIZ; NOA-NOH, NOJ-NON, NOP, NOR-NOZ; NQA-NQH, NQJ-NQN, NQP, NQR-NQZ; PAI-PZI; PAO-PZO; PAQ-PZQ; PIA-PIH
2011	PIJ-PIN, PIP, PIR-PIZ; POA-POH, POJ-PON, POP, POR-POZ; PQA-PQH, PQJ-PQN, PQP, PQR-PQZ; TAI-TZI; TAO-TZO; TAQ-TZQ; TIA-TIH, TIJ-TIN
2012	TIP, TIR-TIZ; TOA-TOH, TOJ-TON, TOP, TOR-TOZ; TQA-TQH, TQJ-TQN, TQP, TQR-TQZ; UAI-UZI; UAO-UZO; UAQ-UZQ; UIA-UIH, UIJ-UIN, UIP, UIR-UIZ; UOA-UOH, UOJ-UON
2013	UOP, UOR-UOZ; UQA-UQH, UQJ-UQN, UQP, UQR-UQZ; WAI-WZI; WAO-WZO; WAQ-WZQ; WIA-WIH, WIJ-WIN, WIP; VRB-VRC; EBW-EBZ; FJB-FJH, FJJ; HBE-HBG (August–October 2013 Special Issue)
2014	WIR-WIZ; WOA-WOH, WOJ-WON, WOP, WOR-WOZ; WQA-WQH, WQJ-WQN, WQP, WQR-WQZ (XAI-ZQZ series skipped)

I, O and Q were originally excluded to avoid confusion with the numbers "1" & "0". But with the exhaustion of the "Z" series in 2009, they were used by reverting to the old "N" series. A new serial scheme was implemented using these characters, instead of the third letter coming into series (e.g. after ZAA-999 has been reached, ZAB-101) the middle letter is the one being replaced (e.g. after NAI-999 series has been exhausted, NBI-101 will follow.) These include combinations for public utility vehicles (middle letters V-Y) and trailers (middle letters U and Z), which were repurposed for private vehicles. After all the possible combinations with I, O and Q as the third letter for the same starting letter have been used, I, O and Q are used as middle letters and the third letter is being replaced (e.g. After NIA-999 has been used, NIB-101 will follow), if the reverted letter is exhausted (e.g. After PQZ-999 has been used, TAI-101 will follow). During 2013, some letter combinations (e.g. FJB-101) were also used in Metro Manila.

E.g.: NFD-838, PAX-329, PGU-909, TAX-798, TFN-697, TSB-466, UGE-522, UTH-468, WBU-389, WSD-220, XAF-789, XDG-289, XHK-537, XJA-993, XJJ-218, XKW-594, XLA-475, XMS-907, XNL-812, XPZ-901 XSC-769, ZCZ-679, NUI-205, NJO-542, NBQ-217, NIA-101, NOR-686, NQZ-544, PXI-296, PSO-338, PQQ-332, PIK-342, POC-902, PQL-497, TEI-517, TZO-390, TSQ-486, TIT-120, TOL-979, TQH-924, UMI-615, UFO-392, UHQ-571, UIP-207, UOG-874, UQF-281, WAI-365, WOO-911, WEQ-451, WIC-143, WOP-723, WQL-856

Special Issue: EBX-578, FJB-357, HBG-257

=== Provincial ===
Private (plate series with approximate year issued):

1981–1989

Region	Year	Series issued
Region I (Ilocos Region/Cordillera Administrative Region)	1981–1989	AAA-AAH, AAJ-AAN, AAP, AAR-AAZ, ABA-ABH, ABJ-ABN, ABP, ABR-ABZ, ACA-ACH, ACJ-ACN
Region II (Cagayan Valley)	1981–1989	BAA-BAH, BAJ-BAN, BAP, BAR-BAZ, BBA-BBH, BBJ-BBN
Region III (Central Luzon)	1981–1989	CAA-CAH, CAJ-CAN, CAP, CAR-CAZ, CBA-CBH, CBJ-CBN, CBP, CBR-CBZ, CCA-CCH, CCJ-CCN, CCP, CCR-CCZ, CDA-CDH, CDJ-CDN, CDP, CDR-CDZ, CEA-CEH, CEJ-CEN, CEP, CER-CEZ, CFA-CFH, CFJ-CFN, CFP, CFR-CFZ, CGA-CGH, CGJ-CGN, CGP, CGR-CGZ, CHA-CHH, CHJ-CHN, CHP
Region IV (Southern Tagalog)	1981–1989	DAA-DAH, DAJ-DAN, DAP, DAR-DAZ, DBA-DBH, DBJ-DBN, DBP, DBR-DBZ, DCA-DCH, DCJ-DCN, DCP, DCR-DCZ, DDA-DDH, DDJ-DDN, DDP, DDR-DDZ, DEA-DEH, DEJ-DEN, DEP, DER-DEZ, DFA-DFH, DFJ-DFN, DFP, DFR-DFZ, DGA-DGH, DGJ-DGN, DGP
Region V (Bicol Region)	1981–1989	EAA-EAH, EAJ-EAN, EAP
Region VI (Western Visayas)	1981–1989	FAA-FAH, FAJ-FAN, FAP, FAR-FAZ, FBA-FBH, FBJ-FBN, FBP, FBR-FBZ, FCA-FCH, FCJ-FCN
Region VII (Central Visayas)	1981–1989	GAA-GAH, GAJ-GAN, GAP, GAR-GAZ, GBA-GBH, GBJ-GBN, GBP, GBR-GBZ, GCA-GCH, GCJ-GCN, GCP, GCR-GCZ
Region VIII (Eastern Visayas)	1981–1989	HAA-HAH
Region IX (Zamboanga Peninsula/BARMM)	1981–1989	JAA-JAH, JAJ-JAN, JAP
Region IX (Northern Mindanao)	1981–1989	KAA-KAH, KAJ-KAN, KAP, KAR-KAZ, KBA-KBH
Region XI (Davao Region/Caraga)	1981–1989	LAA-LAH, LAJ-LAN, LAP, LAR-LAZ, LBA-LBH, LBJ-LBN, LBP, LBR-LBZ, LCA-LCH
Region XII (Soccsksargen)	1981–1989	MAA-MAH, MAJ-MAN

1990–1999

Region	Year	Series issued
Region I (Ilocos Region/Cordillera Administrative Region)	1990–1995	ACP, ACR-ACZ, ADA-ADB (PILIPINAS series)
Region I (Ilocos Region/Cordillera Administrative Region)	1995–1999	ADC-ADH, ADJ-ADN, ADP, ADR-ADZ (PHILIPPINES 2000 series)
Region II (Cagayan Valley)	1990–1995	BBP, BBR-BBV (PILIPINAS series)
Region II (Cagayan Valley)	1995–1999	BBW-BBZ, BCA-BCH, BCJ-BCL (PHILIPPINES 2000 series)
Region III (Central Luzon)	1990–1995	CHR-CHZ, CJA-CJH, CJJ-CJN, CJP, CJR-CJZ, CKA-CKH, CKJ-CKN, CKP, CKR-CKZ, CLA-CLH, CLJ-CLN, CLP, CLR-CLZ, CMA-CMB (PILIPINAS series)
Region III (Central Luzon)	1995–1999	CMC-CMH, CMJ-CMN, CMP, CMR-CMZ, CNA-CNH, CNJ-CNN, CNP, CNR-CNZ, CPA-CPH, CPJ-CPN, CPP, CPR-CPZ, CRA-CRH (PHILIPPINES 2000 series)
Region IV (Southern Tagalog)	1990–1995	DGR-DGZ, DHA-DHH, DHJ-DHN, DHP, DHR-DHZ, DJA-DJH, DJJ-DJN, DJP, DJR-DJZ, DKA-DKH, DKJ-DKN, DKP, DKR-DKZ, DLA-DLH, DLJ-DLN, DLP, DLR-DLZ, DMA-DMH, DMJ-DMN, DMP, DMR-DMZ, DNA-DNB (PILIPINAS series)
Region IV (Southern Tagalog)	1995–1999	DNC-DNH, DNJ-DNN, DNP, DNR-DNZ, DPA-DPH, DPJ-DPN, DPP, DPR-DPZ, DRA-DRH, DRJ-DRN, DRP, DRR-DRZ, DSA-DSH, DSJ-DSN, DSP, DSR-DSZ, DTA-DTH, DTJ-DTN, DTP, DTR-DTZ; VAA-VAH (PHILIPPINES 2000 series)
Region V (Bicol Region)	1990–1995	EAR-EAW (PILIPINAS series)
Region V (Bicol Region)	1995–1999	EAX-EAZ, EBA-EBE (PHILIPPINES 2000 series)
Region VI (Western Visayas)	1990–1995	FCP, FCR-FCZ, FDA-FDH, FDJ-FDN (PILIPINAS series)
Region VI (Western Visayas)	1995–1999	FDP, FDR-FDZ, FEA-FEH, FEJ-FEL (PHILIPPINES 2000 series)
Region VII (Central Visayas)	1990–1995	GDA-GDH, GDJ-GDN, GDP, GDR-GDZ, GEA-GEH, GEJ-GEN, GEP, GER-GEV (PILIPINAS series)
Region VII (Central Visayas)	1995–1999	GEW-GEZ, GFA-GFH, GFJ-GFN, GFP, GFR-GFZ, GGA-GGH, GGJ-GGN, GGP, GGR-GGZ, GHA-GHH, GHJ-GHN, GHP, GHR-GHZ, GJA-GJH, GJJ-GJN, GJP, GJR-GJZ, GKA-GKH, GKJ-GKN, GKP, GKR-GKZ, GLA-GLH, GLJ-GLN (PHILIPPINES 2000 series)
Region VIII (Eastern Visayas)	1990–1995	HAJ-HAN, HAP, HAR-HAT (PILIPINAS series)
Region VIII (Eastern Visayas)	1995–1999	HAU-HAW (PHILIPPINES 2000 series)
Region IX (Zamboanga Peninsula/BARMM)	1990–1995	JAR-JAZ, JBA-JBC (PILIPINAS series)
Region IX (Zamboanga Peninsula/BARMM)	1995–1999	JBD-JBH (PHILIPPINES 2000 series)
Region X (Northern Mindanao)	1990–1995	KBJ-KBN, KBP, KBR-KBV (PILIPINAS series)
Region X (Northern Mindanao)	1995–1999	KBW-KBZ, KCA-KCH (PHILIPPINES 2000 series)
Region XI (Davao Region/Caraga)	1990–1995	LCD-LCH, LCJ-LCN, LCP (PILIPINAS series)
Region XI (Davao Region/Caraga)	1995–1999	LCR-LCZ, LDA-LDH, LDJ-LDN, LDP (PHILIPPINES 2000 series)
Region XII (Soccsksargen)	1990–1995	MAP, MAR-MAZ, MBA-MBB (PILIPINAS series)
Region XII (Soccsksargen)	1995–1999	MBC-MBH, MBJ-MBN (PHILIPPINES 2000 series)

2000–2009

Region	Year	Series issued
Region I (Ilocos Region)	2000–2003	AEA-AEG (PHILIPPINES 2000 series)
Region I (Ilocos Region)	2003–2009	AEH, AEJ-AEN, AEP (MATATAG NA REPUBLIKA series)
C.A.R. (Cordillera Administrative Region)	2000	AHA-AHB (PHILIPPINES 2000 series)
C.A.R. (Cordillera Administrative Region)	2000–2001	AHC-AHD (ANGAT PINOY 2004 series)
C.A.R. (Cordillera Administrative Region)	2001–2003	AHE-AHF (PILIPINAS series)
C.A.R. (Cordillera Administrative Region)	2002–2003	AHG (PERLAS NG SILANGAN series)
C.A.R. (Cordillera Administrative Region)	2003–2009	AHH, AHJ, AHL, AHM (MATATAG NA REPUBLIKA series) (AHK prefix was introduced in 2010s)
Region II (Cagayan Valley)	2000	BCM-BCN (PHILIPPINES 2000 series)
Region II (Cagayan Valley)	2000–2001	BCP, BCR (ANGAT PINOY 2004 series)
Region II (Cagayan Valley)	2001–2003	BCS-BCT, BCW-BCX (PILIPINAS series)
Region II (Cagayan Valley)	2002–2003	BCU-BCV (PERLAS NG SILANGAN series)
Region II (Cagayan Valley)	2003–2009	BCY-BCZ, BDA-BDH, BDJ-BDN, BDP, BDR-BDZ, BEA-BEC (MATATAG NA REPUBLIKA series)
Region III (Central Luzon)	2000	CRJ-CRN, CRP (PHILIPPINES 2000 series)
Region III (Central Luzon)	2000–2001	CRR-CRZ, CSA-CSD (ANGAT PINOY 2004 series)
Region III (Central Luzon)	2001–2003	CSE-CSH, CSJ-CSL, CTD-CTH, CTJ-CTN (PILIPINAS series)
Region III (Central Luzon)	2002–2003	CSM-CSN, CSP, CSR-CSZ, CTA-CTC (PERLAS NG SILANGAN series)
Region III (Central Luzon)	2003–2009	CTP, CTR-CTZ; RAA-RAH, RAJ-RAN, RAP, RAR-RAZ, RBA-RBH, RBJ-RBN, RBP, RBR-RBZ, RCA-RCH, RCJ-RCN, RCP, RCR-RCZ, RDA-RDH, RDJ-RDN, RDP, RDR-RDZ, REA-REH, REJ-REN, REP, RER-REZ, RFA-RFH, RFJ-RFN, RFP, RFR-RFZ, RGA-RGH, RGJ-RGN, RGP, RGR-RGZ, RHA-RHH, RHJ-RHN, RHP, RHR-RHZ, RJA-RJH, RJJ-RJN (MATATAG NA REPUBLIKA series)
Region IV (Southern Tagalog)	2000	VAJ-VAN, VAP, VAR-VAZ (PHILIPPINES 2000 series)
Region IV (Southern Tagalog)	2000–2001	VBA-VBD (ANGAT PINOY 2004 series)
Region IV (Southern Tagalog)	2001–2003	VBE-VBH, VBJ-VBN, VBP, VCA-VCH, VCJ-VCN, VCP, VCR-VCV (PILIPINAS series)
Region IV (Southern Tagalog)	2002–2003	VBR-VBZ (PERLAS NG SILANGAN series)
Region IV (Southern Tagalog)	2003–2009	VCW-VCZ, VDA-VDH, VDJ-VDN, VDP, VDR-VDZ, VEA-VEH (MATATAG NA REPUBLIKA series)
Region V (Bicol Region)	2000	EBF-EBH (PHILIPPINES 2000 series)
Region V (Bicol Region)	2000–2001	EBJ-EBK (ANGAT PINOY 2004 series)
Region V (Bicol Region)	2001–2003	EBL (PILIPINAS series)
Region V (Bicol Region)	2002–2003	EBM (PERLAS NG SILANGAN series)
Region V (Bicol Region)	2003–2009	EBN, EBP, EBR-EBT (MATATAG NA REPUBLIKA series)
Region VI (Western Visayas	2000	FEM-FEN, FEP, FER-FET (PHILIPPINES 2000 series)
Region VI (Western Visayas	2000–2001	FEU-FEV (ANGAT PINOY 2004 series)
Region VI (Western Visayas	2001–2003	FEW-FEZ, FFD-FFE (PILIPINAS series)
Region VI (Western Visayas	2002–2003	FFA-FFC (PERLAS NG SILANGAN series)
Region VI (Western Visayas	2003–2009	FFF-FFH, FFJ-FFN, FFP, FFR-FFZ, FGA-FGH, FGJ-FGN (MATATAG NA REPUBLIKA series)
Region VII (Central Visayas)	2000	GLP, GLR-GLZ, GMA-GMH, GMJ-GMN (PHILIPPINES 2000 series)
Region VII (Central Visayas)	2000–2001	GMP, GMR-GMZ (ANGAT PINOY 2004 series)
Region VII (Central Visayas)	2001–2003	GNA-GNH, GNJ-GNN, GNP, GPF-GPH, GPJ-GPN, GPP, GPR-GPZ, GRA-GRH, GRJ-GRN, GRP, GRR-GRT (PILIPINAS series)
Region VII (Central Visayas)	2002–2003	GNR-GNZ, GPA-GPE (PERLAS NG SILANGAN series)
Region VII (Central Visayas)	2003–2009	GRU-GRZ, GSA-GSH, GSJ-GSN, GSP, GSR,-GSZ, GTA-GTH, GTJ-GTN, GTP, GTR-GTZ; YAA-YAH, YAJ-YAN, YAP, YAR-YAZ, YBA-YBH, YBJ-YBN, YBP, YBR-YBZ, YCA-YCH, YCJ-YCN, YCP, YCR-YCZ, YDA-YDH, YDJ-YDN, YDP, YDR-YDZ, YEA-YEH, YEJ-YEN, YEP, YER-YEZ, YFA-YFH, YFJ-YFN, YFP, YFR-YFZ, YGA-YGH, YGJ-YGN, YGP, YGR-YGZ, YHA-YHH, YHJ, YHK-YHN, YHP, YHR-YHV (MATATAG NA REPUBLIKA series)
Region VIII (Eastern Visayas)	2000	HAX-HAY (PHILIPPINES 2000 series)
Region VIII (Eastern Visayas)	2001–2003	HAZ (PILIPINAS series)
Region VIII (Eastern Visayas)	2002–2003	HBA (PERLAS NG SILANGAN series)
Region VIII (Eastern Visayas)	2003–2009	HBB (MATATAG NA REPUBLIKA series)
Region IX (Zamboanga Peninsula/BARMM)	2000	JBJ-JBL (PHILIPPINES 2000 series)
Region IX (Zamboanga Peninsula/BARMM)	2000–2001	JBM-JBN (ANGAT PINOY 2004 series)
Region IX (Zamboanga Peninsula/BARMM)	2001–2003	JBR-JBT (PILIPINAS series)
Region IX (Zamboanga Peninsula/BARMM)	2002–2003	JBP (PERLAS NG SILANGAN series)
Region IX (Zamboanga Peninsula/BARMM)	2003–2009	JBU-JBZ, JCA-JCH, JCJ-JCN, JCP, JCR-JCZ, JDA-JDD (MATATAG NA REPUBLIKA series)
Region X (Northern Mindanao)	2000	KCJ-KCK (PHILIPPINES 2000 series)
Region X (Northern Mindanao)	2001–2003	KCL, KCN, KCP, KCR-KCV (PILIPINAS series)
Region X (Northern Mindanao)	2002–2003	KCM (PERLAS NG SILANGAN series)
Region X (Northern Mindanao)	2003–2009	KCW-KCZ, KDA-KDH, KDJ-KDN, KDP, KDR-KDZ, KEA-KEH (MATATAG NA REPUBLIKA series)
Region XI (Davao Region)	2000	LDR-LDZ (PHILIPPINES 2000 series)
Region XI (Davao Region)	2000–2001	LEA-LEH (ANGAT PINOY 2004 series)
Region XI (Davao Region)	2001–2003	LEJ-LEN, LEP, LER-LEZ (PILIPINAS series)
Region XI (Davao Region)	2003–2009	LFA-LFH, LFJ-LFN, LFP, LFR-LFZ, LGA-LGH, LGJ-LGN, LGP (MATATAG NA REPUBLIKA series)
Region XII (Soccsksargen)	2000	MBP, MBR-MBT (PHILIPPINES 2000 series)
Region XII (Soccsksargen)	2000–2001	MBU-MBV (ANGAT PINOY 2004 series)
Region XII (Soccsksargen)	2001–2003	MBW-MBZ (PILIPINAS series)
Region XII (Soccsksargen)	2003–2009	MCA-MCH, MCJ-MCN, MCP, MCR-MCZ, MDA-MDH, MDJ-MDN, MDP, MDR-MDZ, MEA-MEH (MATATAG NA REPUBLIKA series)
Region XIII (Caraga)	2000–2003	LMA-LMD (PHILIPPINES 2000 series)
Region XIII (Caraga)	2003–2009	LME-LMH, LMJ-LMN, LMP (MATATAG NA REPUBLIKA series)

2010–2014

Region	Year	Series issued
Region I (Ilocos Region)	2010–2014	AER-AEZ, AFA-AFG (AFH, AFJ-AFN, AFP, AFR-AFZ series skipped)
C.A.R. (Cordillera Administrative Region)	2010–2014	AHK, AHN, AHP, AHR-AHT (AHU-AHZ series skipped)
Region II (Cagayan Valley)	2010–2014	BEJ-BEN, BEP, BER-BEZ, BFA-BFE (BFF-BFH, BFJ-BFN, BFP, BFR-BFZ series skipped)
Region III (Central Luzon)	2010–2014	RJP, RJR-RJZ, RKA-RKH, RKJ-RKN, RKP, RKR-RKZ, RLA-RLH, RLJ-RLN, RLP, RLR-RLZ, RMA-RMH, RMJ-RMN, RMP, RMR-RMZ, RNA-RNH, RNJ-RNN, RNP, RNR-RNU (RNV-RNX is used for special plate in Soccsksargen); MGE-MGH (August–October 2013 Special Issue) (RNY-RNZ series skipped)
Region IV (Southern Tagalog)	2010–2014	VEJ-VEN, VEP, VER-VEZ, VFA-VFH, VFJ-VFN, VFP (VFR-VFU is used for special plate in Central Visayas); VRA-VRC (VFV-VFZ; VRD-VRH, VRJ-VRN, VRP, VRR-VRZ series skipped)
Region V (Bicol Region)	2010–2014	EBU-EBV, ECA-ECD (The whole EBW-EBZ series were skipped and instead issued in NCR.) (ECE-ECH, ECJ-ECN, ECP, ECR-ECZ series skipped)
Region VI (Western Visayas)	2010–2014	FGP, FGR-FGZ, FHA-FHH, FHJ-FHN, FHP, FHR-FHW (FHX-FHZ is used for special plates for Central Visayas, FJA is used for special plate for Davao Region, and FJB-FJH and FJJ is used for special plate for NCR.) (FJK-FJN, FJP, FJR-FJZ series skipped)
Region VII (Central Visayas)	2010–2014	YHW-YHZ, YJA-YJH, YJJ-YJZ, YKA-YKH, YKJ-YKN, YKP, YKR-YKZ, YLA-YLH, YLJ-YLN, YLP, YLR; VFR-VFU; FHX-FHZ (August–October 2013 Special Issue) (YLS-YLZ series skipped)
Region VIII (Eastern Visayas)	2010–2014	HBC-HBD, HBH, HBJ-HBK (The rest of HBE-HBG is used for special plate for NCR.) (HBL-HBN, HBP, HBR-HBZ series skipped)
Region IX (Zamboanga Peninsula/BARMM)	2010–2014	JDJ-JDN, JDP, JDR-JDZ, JEA-JEH, JEJ-JEN, JEP, JER-JEZ, JFA-JFH, JFJ-JFK, JGZ (JFL-JFN, JFP, JFR-JFZ; JGA-JGH, JGJ-JGN, JGP, JGR-JGY series skipped)
Region X (Northern Mindanao)	2010–2014	KEJ-KEN, KEP, KER-KEZ, KFA-KFH, KFJ-KFN, KFP, KFR-KFZ, KGA-KGH, KGJ-KGN, KGP, KGR-KGZ, KHA, KHB (KHC-KHH, KHJ-KHN, KHP, KHR-KHZ series skipped)
Region XI (Davao Region)	2010–2014	LGR-LGZ, LHA-LHH, LHJ-LHN, LHP; FJA (August–October 2013 Special Issue) (LHR-LHZ series skipped)
Region XII (Soccsksargen)	2010–2014	MEJ-MEN, MEP, MER-MEZ, MFA-MFH, MFJ-MFN, MFP, MFR-MFZ, MGA-MGD (MGE-MGH is used for special plate for Central Luzon.), MGJ-MGL; RNV-RNX (August–October 2013 Special Issue) (MGM-MGN, MGP, MGR-MGZ series skipped)
Region XIII (Caraga)	2010–2014	LMR-LMZ, LNA-LNH, LNJ-LNN (LNP, LNR-LNZ series skipped)

== Regional issued plates (2014 & 2018 series) ==
=== Metro Manila ===
Private (plate series with approximate year issued):

Year	Series issued
2014	AAA 3001, AAH 6001, AAI 1001, AAJ 1001, AAK 1001, AAL 2001, AAM 1001, AAN 1001, AAO 1001, AAP 1001, AAQ 1001, AAW 6001, AAX 1001, AAY 1001, AAZ 1001; ABA 8001, ACA 1001, ADA 1001; 4101; 8501, AEA 1001, AFA 5901 (New series)
2015	AGA 6001, AHA 1001, AIA 1001, AJA 1001, AKA 1001, ALA 1001, AOA 3001, APA 1001, AQA 1001, ARA 1001, ASA 1001, ATA 1001, AVA 1001; ABB 1001, ABC 7001, ABD 1001, ABE 1001, ABF 1001, ABG 1001, ABH 1001, ABO 1001, ABP 1001, ABQ 1001, ABR 1001, ABS 1001, ABT 1001
2016	NBV 6001, NBW 1001, NBX 1001; NCC 8301, NCD 1001, NCE 1001, NCF 1001, NCG 1001, NCH 1001, NCI 1001, NCJ 1001, NCK 1001, NCX 4501, NCY 1001, NCZ 1001; NDB 1001, NDC 1001, NDD 1001, NDE 1001, NDF 1001, NDG 1001, NDH 1001, NDQ 5701, NDR 1001, NDS 1001, NDT 1001, NDU 1001, NDV 1001, NDW 1001, NDX 1001, NDY 1001, NDZ 1001 (Updated features)
2017	NAB 1001, NAC 1001, NAD 1001, NAE 1001, NAF 1001, NAG 1001, NAH 1001, NAL 1001, NAR 1001, NAS 1001, NAT 1001, NAU 1001, NAV 1001, NAW 1001, NAZ 5001; NBA 1001, NBB 6001, NBI 1001, NBJ 1001, NBL 1001, NBM 1001, NBN 1001, NBU 1001, NBV 1001, NBX 5001, NBY 1001, NBZ 1001; NCB 1001, NCC 1001, NCN 1001, NCO 1001, NCP 1001
2018	NAA 1001, NAI 1001, NAJ 1001, NAK 1001, NAM 1001, NAO 1001, NAP 1001, NAQ 1001, NAW 5001, NAX 1001, NAY 1001, NAZ 1001; NBA 6001, NBB 1001, NBC 1001, NBD 1001, NBE 1001, NBF 1001, NBG 1001, NBK 1001, NBP 1001; NCA 1001, NCL 1001, NCM 1001, NCQ 1001, NCR 1001, NCS 1001, NCT 1001, NCU 1001, NCV 1001, NCW 1001, NCX 1001
2019	NBH 1001, NBO 1001, NBQ 1001, NBR 1001, NBS 1001, NBT 1001; NDA 1001, NDI 1001, NDJ 1001, NDK 1001, NDL 1001, NDM 1001, NDN 1001, NDO 4501, NDP 1001, NDQ 1001; NEA 1001, NEB 1001, NEC 1001, NED 1001, NEG 1001, NEH 1001, NEI 1001, NEJ 1001
2020	NAN 1001; NEF 1001, NEN 1001, NEU 1001; NFN 3001, NFT 1001, NFU 1001, NFV 1001, NFW 1001, NFX 1001, NFY 1001, NFZ 1001; NGA 1001, NGD 1001, NGF 1001, NGG 1001, NGH 1301, NGJ 1001, NGK 1001, NGL 1001, NGM 1001, NGO 1001, NGP 1001, NGR 1001
2021	NDO 1001, NDZ 5301; NEF 5001, NEK 1001, NEL 1001, NEM 1001, NEO 1001, NEP 1001, NEQ 1001, NES 1001, NET 1001, NEV 1001, NEW 1001, NEX 1001; NFC 1001, NFI 1001, NFQ 1001; NGB 1001, NGN 1001, NGS 1001, NGT 1001, NGU 1001, NGY 1001; NHA 1001
2022	NEE 1001, NEK 6001, NEN 5501, NER 1001; NFD 1001, NFE 1001, NFG 1001, NFH 1001, NFJ 1001, NFK 1001, NFL 1001, NFO 1001, NFP 1001; NGK 5001, NGQ 1001, NGX 1001, NGY 4001; NHB 1001, NHC 1001; NIB 1001, NIC 1001, NID 1001, NIE 1001, NIF 1001
2023	NEE 3001, NEY 1001; NFA 1001, NFB 1001, NFC 5001; NGC 1001; NHA 2001, NHC 5001, NHD 1001, NHE 1001, NHF 1001, NHI 1001, NHJ 1001, NHL 1001; NIG 1001, NIH 1001, NII 1001, NIJ 1001, NIK 1001, NIL 1001, NIM 1001, NIN 1001, NIO 1001, NIP 1001, NIQ 1001, NIR 1001, NIS 1001, NIT 1001, NIU 1001
2024	NEY 4001, NEZ 1001; NFF 1001, NFM 1001, NFN 1001, NFR 1001, NFS 1001; NHG 1001, NHH 1001, NHK 1001, NHL 5001, NHM 1001, NHN 1001, NHO 1001, NHQ 1001, NHR 1001, NHS 1001, NHT 1001, NHU 1001; NIA 1001; NJD 1001; NKA 1001, NKB 1001, NKC 1001, NKD 1001, NKE 1001, NKF 1001, NKG 1001, NKI 1001, NKJ 1001, NKK 1001; NOA 1001
2025	NGH 1001; NHP 1001; NJA 1001, NJB 1001, NJC 1001, NJE 1001, NJF 1001, NJG 1001, NJH 1001, NJI 1001, NJJ 1001, NJK 1001, NJL 1001, NJM 1001, NJQ 1001, NJR 1001; NKH 1001, NKL 1001, NKM 1001, NKN 1001, NKO 1001, NKP 1001, NKQ 1001, NKR 1001, NKS 1001, NKT 1001, NKU 1001; NLA 1001, NLB 1001, NLC 1001; NOA 3001
2026	NGE 1001, NGI 1001; NHK 1601; NJN 1001, NJO 1001, NJP 1001, NJS 1001, NJT 1001, NJU 1001; NLD 1001, NLE 1001, NLF 1001, NLG 1001, NLH 1001, NLI 1001, NLJ 1001, NLK 1001, NLL 1001, NLN 1001, NLP 1001, NLQ 1001, NLR 1001, NLS 1001, NLT 1001; NNA 1001; NOA 9001, NOB 1001

=== Provincial ===
Private (plate series with approximate year issued):

2014–2019

Region	Year	Series issued
Region I (Ilocos Region)	2014–2015	New series: AAA 1001, AAR 2001, AAS 5501, AAU 4501; ABA 3001, ALA 5001, AVA 6001; ABI 1001
Region I (Ilocos Region)	2016	Updated features: IBV 3001, IBZ 6001; ICC 8001, ICL 1001; IDI 1001; IEE 1101
Region I (Ilocos Region)	2017	IAA 1001
Region I (Ilocos Region)	2018	IAA 5001, IAB 1001
Region I (Ilocos Region)	2019	IAB 5001, IAC 1001
C.A.R. (Cordillera Administrative Region)	2014–2015	New series: AAK 9001, AAU 5001; ADA 3901; ABN 9501
C.A.R. (Cordillera Administrative Region)	2016	Updated features: YCX 1001
C.A.R. (Cordillera Administrative Region)	2017	YAA 1001
C.A.R. (Cordillera Administrative Region)	2018	YAA 3001
C.A.R. (Cordillera Administrative Region)	2019	YAA 5001
Region II (Cagayan Valley)
Region II (Cagayan Valley)	2014–2015	New series: AAA 2001, AAT 1001; AEA 8501, ALA 7001, AVA 6501; ABI 3601
Region II (Cagayan Valley)	2016	Updated features: BBV 4001, BBX 1001, BBZ 2001; BCL 4001; BDI 3001
Region II (Cagayan Valley)	2017	BAA 1001
Region II (Cagayan Valley)	2018	BAA 5001
Region II (Cagayan Valley)	2019	BAB 1001
Region III (Central Luzon)
Region III (Central Luzon)	2014–2015	New series: AAB 1001, AAQ 7001, AAR 1001, AAT 1501, AAU 6001, AAV 1001; AFA 6501, ALA 7501, AMA 1001, AVA 7001, AWA 1001; ABB 1501, ABI 4001, ABJ 1001, ABK 1001
Region III (Central Luzon)	2016	Updated features: CBF 3001, CBG 1001, CBX 4001; CCL 7001, CCM 1001, CCN 1001, CCO 1001; CDI 4001, CDJ 1001, CDK 1001, CDZ 5101
Region III (Central Luzon)	2017	CAA 1001, CAC 1001, CAD 1001, CAE 1001, CAF 1001, CAG 1001, CAH 1001
Region III (Central Luzon)	2018	CAB 1001, CAI 1001, CAJ 1001, CAK 1001, CAL 1001, CAM 1001, CAN 1001
Region III (Central Luzon)	2019	CAO 1001, CAP 1001, CAQ 1001, CAR 1001, CAS 1001, CAT 1001, CAY 1001
Region IV (Southern Tagalog)	2014–2015 (Region IV-A – Calabarzon)	New series: AAB 9001, AAC 1001, AAD 1001, AAV 7001, AAW 1001; AEA 8701, AWA 8001, AXA 1001; ABB 6201, ABL 1001
Region IV (Southern Tagalog)	2016 (Region IV-A – Calabarzon)	Updated features: DBX 7001, DBY 1001, DBZ 1001; DCB 1001, DCP 1001, DCQ 1001, DCR 1001; DDL 3001, DDM 1001, DDZ 8001; DEB 1001
Region IV (Southern Tagalog)	2017 (Region IV-A – Calabarzon)	DAA 1001, DAB 1001, DAC 1001, DAD 5001, DAE 1001, DAF 1001
Region IV (Southern Tagalog)	2018 (Region IV-A – Calabarzon)	DAC 5001, DAD 1001, DAG 1001, DAH 1001, DAI 1001, DAJ 1001
Region IV (Southern Tagalog)	2019 (Region IV-A – Calabarzon)	DAJ 5001, DAK 1001, DAL 1001, DAM 1001, DAN 1001, DAO 1001
Region IV (Southern Tagalog)	2014–2015 (Region IV-B – Mimaropa)	New series: AAD 5001
Region IV (Southern Tagalog)	2016 (Region IV-B – Mimaropa)	Updated features: VBI 1001; VCR 1201; VDM 5001; VEB 2401
Region IV (Southern Tagalog)	2017 (Region IV-B – Mimaropa)	VAA 1001
Region IV (Southern Tagalog)	2018 (Region IV-B – Mimaropa)	VAA 3001
Region IV (Southern Tagalog)	2019 (Region IV-B – Mimaropa)	VAA 5001
Region V (Bicol Region)	2014–2015	New series: AAD 6001; ABA 5001, AFA 9001, AGA 1001, AMA 8001, AXA 3101; ABL 9001
Region V (Bicol Region)	2016	Updated features: EBY 3001; ECR 1501; EDM 5001
Region V (Bicol Region)	2017	EAA 1001
Region V (Bicol Region)	2018	EAB 1001, EAD 1001
Region V (Bicol Region)	2019	EAC 1001, EAD 3001
Region VI (Western Visayas)	2014–2015	New series: AAD 7001, AAR 3501; ABA 3001, AGA 1101, AMA 9001, ANA 1001, AXA 3701; ABM 1001
Region VI (Western Visayas)	2016	Updated features: FBY 4001; FCB 3501, FCR 6001, FCS 1001; FDM 6001
Region VI (Western Visayas)	2017	FAA 1001, FAB 1001, FAC 1001, FAH 7001
Region VI (Western Visayas)	2018	FAD 1001, FAE 1001, FAI 1001
Region VI (Western Visayas)	2019	FAF 1001, FAG 1001, FAM 1001
Region VII (Central Visayas)	2014–2015	New series: AAD 8001, AAE 1001, AAF 1001, AAZ 4501; AFA 1001, AXA 5801; ABM 5501, ABN 1001
Region VII (Central Visayas)	2016	Updated features: GBY 5601; GCS 1301; GDM 9001, GDN 1001; GEB 2801, GEC 1001; GEC 4401, GED 1001, GEE 1001
Region VII (Central Visayas)	2017	GAA 1001, GAB 1001, GAC 1001, GAD 1001, GAF 5001, GAG 1001
Region VII (Central Visayas)	2018	GAE 1001, GAF 1001, GAG 3001, GAH 1001, GAI 1001, GAJ 1001
Region VII (Central Visayas)	2019	GAL 1001, GAM 1001, GAN 1001, GAP 8501, GAQ 1001, GAX 1001
Region VIII (Eastern Visayas)	2014–2015	New series: AAF 5001, AAW 5501; ABA 6001, AFA 3701; ABN 9001
Region VIII (Eastern Visayas)	2016	Updated features: HCT 1001; HEC 2001,
Region VIII (Eastern Visayas)	2017	HAA 1001
Region VIII (Eastern Visayas)	2018	HAB 1001
Region VIII (Eastern Visayas)	2019	HAB 4001
Region IX (Zamboanga Peninsula & BARMM)	2014–2015	New series: AAF 6001, AAR 6001, AAT 4901; AFA 3901, ANA 2001, AXA 9001; ABU 1001
Region IX (Zamboanga Peninsula & BARMM)	2016	Updated features: JBB 7901, JBZ 6001; JCT 3001, JCU 1001; JDN 9551, JDO 1001
Region IX (Zamboanga Peninsula & BARMM)	2017	JAA 1001, JAB 1001, JAC 1001
Region IX (Zamboanga Peninsula & BARMM)	2018	JAD 1001, JAE 1001, JAF 1001
Region IX (Zamboanga Peninsula & BARMM)	2019	JAG 6001, JAH 1001, JAI 1001
Region X (Northern Mindanao)	2014–2015	New series: AAF 7001, AAR 8901, AAS 1001, AAU 4501; AFA 5001, ANA 4001; ABB 6901; ABC 1001
Region X (Northern Mindanao)	2016	Updated features: KBB 9001, KBY 8601; KCB 5001, KCU 2001; KDO 7001
Region X (Northern Mindanao)	2017	KAA 1001
Region X (Northern Mindanao)	2018	KAB 1001
Region X (Northern Mindanao)	2019	KAC 1001, KAD 1001
Region XI (Davao Region)	2014–2015	New series: AAF 8001, AAG 1001, AAH 1001
Region XI (Davao Region)	2016	Updated features: LCD 2001, LCU 8001, LCV 1001; LDP 1001; LEC 1001
Region XI (Davao Region)	2017	LAA 1001, LAB 1001
Region XI (Davao Region)	2018	LAC 1001, LAD 1001
Region XI (Davao Region)	2019	LAE 1001, LAF 1001
Region XII (Soccsksargen)	2014–2015	New series: AAH 5001, AAS 2001, AAT 9801, AAU 1001; ABA 7001, AGA 2001, ANA 7001, AOA 1001; ABC 5001, ABU 7001, ABV 1001
Region XII (Soccsksargen)	2016	Updated features: MBA 7001, MBV 1001, MBY 9501, MBZ 1001; MCB 8001, MCC 1001, MCV 5001, MCW 1001, MCX 5001; MDP 6001, MDQ 1001
Region XII (Soccsksargen)	2017	MAA 1001, MAB 1001, MAC 1001, MAD 1001
Region XII (Soccsksargen)	2018	MAD 5001, MAE 1001, MAF 1001, MAG 1001
Region XII (Soccsksargen)	2019	MAH 1001, MAI 1001, MAJ 1001, MAK 1001
Region XIII (Caraga)	2014–2015	New series: AAL 1001, AAU 4101; ADA 8001, AFA 5501; ABB 7801
Region XIII (Caraga)	2016	Updated features: ZCC 7601, ZCX 3001
Region XIII (Caraga)	2017	ZAA 1001
Region XIII (Caraga)	2018	ZAA 5001
Region XIII (Caraga)	2019	ZAB 1001

2020–present*

Region	Year	Series issued
Region I (Ilocos Region)	2020	IAB 7001, IAC 5001
Region I (Ilocos Region)	2021	IAC 7001, IAD 1001
Region I (Ilocos Region)	2022	IAC 1001, IAD 3001
Region I (Ilocos Region)	2023	IAD 5001, IAE 1001
Region I (Ilocos Region)	2024	IAE 5001, IAF 1001, IAJ 1001
Region I (Ilocos Region)	2025	IAG 1001, IAI 1001, IAK 1001
Region I (Ilocos Region)	2026	IAH 1001, IAL 1001, IAM 1001
C.A.R. (Cordillera Administrative Region)	2020	YAA 7001
C.A.R. (Cordillera Administrative Region)	2021	YAA 9001
C.A.R. (Cordillera Administrative Region)	2022	YAB 1001
C.A.R. (Cordillera Administrative Region)	2023	YAB 3001
C.A.R. (Cordillera Administrative Region)	2024	YAB 5001
C.A.R. (Cordillera Administrative Region)	2025	YAB 7001, YAC 1001
C.A.R. (Cordillera Administrative Region)	2026	YAB 9001, YAC 3001
Region II (Cagayan Valley)	2020	BAB 5001, BAC 1001
Region II (Cagayan Valley)	2021	BAC 3001, BAE 1001
Region II (Cagayan Valley)	2022	BAC 5001, BAE 5001, BAF 1001
Region II (Cagayan Valley)	2023	BAC 7001, BAE 9001, BAF 5001
Region II (Cagayan Valley)	2024	BAC 9001, BAG 1001, BAH 1001
Region II (Cagayan Valley)	2025	BAG 5001, BAH 5001, BAI 1001
Region II (Cagayan Valley)	2026	BAD 1001, BAI 5001, BAJ 1001
Region III (Central Luzon)	2020	CAU 1001, CAV 1001, CAZ 1001; CBB 1001, CBC 1001, CBJ 1001, CBK 1001
Region III (Central Luzon)	2021	CAW 1001; CBB 4001, CBK 3001, CBL 1001, CBM 1001, CBN 1001, CBP 5001
Region III (Central Luzon)	2022	CAX 1001; CBD 1001, CBE 1001, CBK 5001, CBP 1001, CBQ 1001, CBR 1001
Region III (Central Luzon)	2023	CAZ 4001; CBA 1001, CBF 1001, CBI 1001, CBK 7001, CBS 1001, CBT 1001, CBU 1001; CCA 1001, CCB 1001, CCC 1001
Region III (Central Luzon)	2024	CAZ 7001; CBB 5001, CBG 6001, CBK 9001, CBO 1001; CCC 5001, CCD 1001, CCE 1001, CCF 1001, CCG 1001, CCJ 1001, CCK 1001
Region III (Central Luzon)	2025	CBO 5001; CCD 5001, CCI 1001, CCL 1001, CCP 1001, CCQ 1001, CCR 1001; CDA 1001, CDB 1001, CDC 1001, CDD 1001
Region III (Central Luzon)	2026	CBG 8001, CBH 1001; CCH 1001, CCS 1001, CCT 1001, CCU 1001; CDE 1001, CDF 1001, CDG 1001
Region IV (Southern Tagalog)	2020 (Region IV-A – Calabarzon)	DAO 7001, DAT 1001, DAY 1001, DAZ 1001; DBA 1001, DBB 1001
Region IV (Southern Tagalog)	2021 (Region IV-A – Calabarzon)	DAT 7001, DAU 1001, DAV 1001; DBB 2001, DBE 1001, DBF 1001
Region IV (Southern Tagalog)	2022 (Region IV-A – Calabarzon)	DAP 1001, DAQ 1001, DAR 1001, DAS 1001, DAX 1001; DBE 7001
Region IV (Southern Tagalog)	2023 (Region IV-A – Calabarzon)	DAS 8001; DBB 4001, DBG 1001, DBH 1001, DBI 1001, DBJ 1001
Region IV (Southern Tagalog)	2024 (Region IV-A – Calabarzon)	DBF 5001, DBK 1001, DBL 1001, DBM 1001, DBN 1001, DBO 1001, DBP 1001, DBR 1001
Region IV (Southern Tagalog)	2025 (Region IV-A - Calabarzon)	DBQ 1001, DBS 1001, DBT 1001, DBU 1001; DCA 1001, DCB 3701, DCC 1001, DCD 1001, DCE 1001
Region IV (Southern Tagalog)	2026 (Region IV-A - Calabarzon)	DCB 4001, DCF 1001, DCG 1001, DCH 1001, DCI 1001, DCJ 1001, DCK 1001
Region IV (Southern Tagalog)	2020 (Region IV-B – Mimaropa)	VAA 7001
Region IV (Southern Tagalog)	2021 (Region IV-B – Mimaropa)	VAA 9001
Region IV (Southern Tagalog)	2022 (Region IV-B – Mimaropa)	VAB 1001
Region IV (Southern Tagalog)	2023 (Region IV-B – Mimaropa)	VAB 5001
Region IV (Southern Tagalog)	2024 (Region IV-B – Mimaropa)	VAC 1001
Region IV (Southern Tagalog)	2025 (Region IV-B - Mimaropa)	VAC 3001
Region IV (Southern Tagalog)	2026 (Region IV-B - Mimaropa)	VAC 5001, VAD 1001
Region V (Bicol Region)	2020	EAC 5001, EAD 5001
Region V (Bicol Region)	2021	EAD 7001, EAE 1001
Region V (Bicol Region)	2022	EAD 9001, EAF 1001
Region V (Bicol Region)	2023	EAG 1001, EAJ 1001
Region V (Bicol Region)	2024	EAH 1001, EAI 1001, EAK 1001
Region V (Bicol Region)	2025	EAL 1001, EAM 1001, EAN 1001
Region V (Bicol Region)	2026	EAN 6001, EAO 1001, EAP 1001
Region VI (Western Visayas)	2020	FAG 7001, FAH 1001, FAL 1001
Region VI (Western Visayas)	2021	FAF 3001, FAI 2001, FAM 5001
Region VI (Western Visayas)	2022	FAH 3001, FAJ 1001, FAN 1001
Region VI (Western Visayas)	2023	FAO 1001, FAP 1001, FAQ 1001
Region VI (Western Visayas)	2024	FAR 1001, FAS 1001, FAU 1001
Region VI (Western Visayas)	2025	FAT 1001; FBA 1001, FBB 1001, FBC 1001, FBD 1001
Region VI (Western Visayas)	2026	FBE 1001, FBF 1001, FBG 1001, FBH 1001
Region VII (Central Visayas)	2020	GAN 6001, GAO 1001, GAU 1001
Region VII (Central Visayas)	2021	GAT 1001, GAV 1001, GAW 1001
Region VII (Central Visayas)	2022	GAP 1001, GAR 1001, GAS 1001
Region VII (Central Visayas)	2023	GAK 1001, GAQ 9001, GAZ 4001; GBA 1001, GBC 1001, GBG 1001, GBH 1001
Region VII (Central Visayas)	2024	GAX 4001, GAZ 1001; GBC 4001, GBD 1001, GBE 1001, GBF 1001, GBH 3001, GBI 1001, GBJ 1001
Region VII (Central Visayas)	2025	GBB 1001, GBH 5001, GBI 3001, GBJ 3001, GBK 1001, GBL 1001, GBM 1001, GBO 1001, GBQ 1001
Region VII (Central Visayas)	2026	GAY 1001; GBB 4001, GBL 5001, GBM 5001, GBN 1001, GBO 3501, GBP 1001, GBQ 3001, GBR 1001, GBS 1001
Region VIII (Eastern Visayas)	2020	HAB 7001, HAC 1001
Region VIII (Eastern Visayas)	2021	HAC 5001, HAD 1001
Region VIII (Eastern Visayas)	2022	HAF 1001, HAG 1001
Region VIII (Eastern Visayas)	2023	HAE 1001, HAF 5001
Region VIII (Eastern Visayas)	2024	HAH 1001, HAI 1001
Region VIII (Eastern Visayas)	2025	HAI 5001, HAJ 1001
Region VIII (Eastern Visayas)	2026	HAJ 5001, HAK 1001
Region IX (Zamboanga Peninsula & BARMM)	2020	JAI 5001, JAJ 1001, JAK 1001
Region IX (Zamboanga Peninsula & BARMM)	2021	JAE 5001, JAF 5001, JAL 1001
Region IX (Zamboanga Peninsula & BARMM)	2022	JAG 1001, JAM 1001, JAN 1001
Region IX (Zamboanga Peninsula & BARMM)	2023	JAO 1001, JAR 1001, JAT 1001
Region IX (Zamboanga Peninsula & BARMM)	2024	JAQ 1001, JAS 1001, JAU 6001
Region IX (Zamboanga Peninsula & BARMM)	2025	JAU 1001; JBA 1001, JBG 1001, JBH 1001, JBJ 1001
Region IX (Zamboanga Peninsula & BARMM)	2026	JAP 1001; JBB 1001, JBC 1001, JBD 1001, JBF 1001, JBH 5001, JBI 1001, JBJ 3001
Region X (Northern Mindanao)	2020	KAE 1001, KAF 1001, KAH 1001, KAJ 1001
Region X (Northern Mindanao)	2021	KAG 1001, KAI 1001, KAK 1001, KAL 1001
Region X (Northern Mindanao)	2022	KAM 1001, KAN 1001, KAO 1001, KAP 1001
Region X (Northern Mindanao)	2023	KAE 2001, KAQ 1001, KAR 1001, KAS 1001
Region X (Northern Mindanao)	2024	KAT 1001; KBB 1001, KBC 1001, KBE 1001
Region X (Northern Mindanao)	2025	KAU 1001; KBA 1001, KBD 1001, KBF 1001, KBG 1001, KBH 1001, KBK 1001
Region X (Northern Mindanao)	2026	KBI 1001, KBJ 1001, KBK 5001, KBL 1001, KBM 1001, KBN 1001
Region XI (Davao Region)	2020	LAG 1001, LAH 1001
Region XI (Davao Region)	2021	LAI 1001, LAJ 1001
Region XI (Davao Region)	2022	LAK 1001, LAL 1001
Region XI (Davao Region)	2023	LAM 1001, LAN 1001
Region XI (Davao Region)	2024	LAO 1001, LAP 1001
Region XI (Davao Region)	2025	LAQ 1001, LAR 1001, LAS 1001
Region XI (Davao Region)	2026	LAS 3001, LAT 1001, LAU 1001; LBA 1001
Region XII (Soccsksargen)	2020	MAL 1001, MAM 1001, MAO 1001, MAP 1001, MAQ 1001
Region XII (Soccsksargen)	2021	MAN 1001, MAT 1001, MAU 1001, MAV 1001, MAX 1001
Region XII (Soccsksargen)	2022	MAR 1001, MAS 1001, MAZ 1001; MBA 4001
Region XII (Soccsksargen)	2023	MAJ 6501, MAQ 5001, MAW 1001, MAY 1001; MBA 1001
Region XII (Soccsksargen)	2024	MBD 1001, MBE 1001, MBF 1001, MBH 1001, MBJ 1001, MBK 1001
Region XII (Soccsksargen)	2025	MBG 1001, MBI 1001, MBL 1001, MBM 1001, MBN 1001, MBO 1001
Region XII (Soccsksargen)	2026	MBB 1001, MBC 1001, MBO 2001, MBQ 1001, MBR 1001, MBS 1001
Region XIII (Caraga)	2020	ZAB 5001
Region XIII (Caraga)	2021	ZAC 1001
Region XIII (Caraga)	2022	ZAC 5001, ZAD 1001
Region XIII (Caraga)	2023	ZAD 5001, ZAF 1001
Region XIII (Caraga)	2024	ZAD 7001, ZAF 5001
Region XIII (Caraga)	2025	ZAD 9001, ZAE 1001, ZAG 1001
Region XIII (Caraga)	2026	ZAG 6001, ZAE 5001, ZAH 1001, ZAI 1001, ZAJ 1001

== Regional issued yellow plates ==
=== Metro Manila ===
Public (plate series with approximate year issued):

Year	Series issued
1981	NVA-NVH, NVJ-NVN, NVP
1982	NVR-NVZ
1983	NWA-NWG
1984	NWH, NWJ-NWL
1985	NWM-NWN, NWP, NWR
1986	NWS-NWV
1987	NWW-NWZ
1988	NXA-NXD
1989	NXE-NXH
1990	NXJ-NXM
1991	NXN, NXP, NXR-NXS
1992	NXT-NXW
1993	NXX-NXZ, NYA-NYG
1994	NYH, NYJ-NYN, NYP, NYR-NYT
1995	NYU-NYZ; PVA-PVH, PVJ-PVN, PVP, PVR-PVT
1996	PVU-PVZ, PWA-PWH, PWJ-PWN, PWP, PWR-PWT
1997	PWU-PWZ, PXA-PXH, PXJ-PXN, PXP, PXR-PXT
1998	PXU-PXZ, PYA-PYH, PYJ-PYN, PYP
1999	PYR-PYX; TVA-TVH
2000	TVJ-TVN, TVP, TVR-TVZ
2001	TWA-TWE
2002	PYY; TWF-TWH, TWJ-TWL
2003	PYZ; TWM-TWN, TWP, TWR-TWT
2004	TWU-TWX, TYA-TYB
2005	TWY-TWZ, TXA-TXD, TYC-TYE
2006	TXE-TXH, TYF-TYH
2007	TXJ-TXN, TYJ-TYL
2008	TXP, TXR-TXU, TYM-TYN, TYP
2009	TXV-TXZ, TYR-TYT
2010	TYU-TYW; UVA-UVH
2011	TYX-TYZ; UVJ-UVN, UVP, UVR-UVT
2012	UVU-UVZ, UWA-UWE, UYA-UYB
2013	UWF-UWH, UWJ-UWN, UYC-UYD; AWC-AWD (UXA-UXH, UXJ-UXN, UXP, UXR-UXZ series was skipped)
2014	UYE-UYF (UWP, UWR-UWZ, UYG-UYH, UYJ-UYN, UYP, UYR-UYZ series was skipped); AAA, AAH, AAI, AAJ, AAK, AAL, AAM, AAN, AAO, AAP, AAQ, AAW, AAX, AAY, AAZ; ABA, ACA, ADA, AEA, AFA (New series)
2015	AGA, AHA, AIA, AJA, AKA, ALA, AOA, APA, AQA, ARA, ASA, ATA, AVA; ABB, ABC, ABD, ABE, ABF, ABG, ABH, ABO, ABP, ABQ, ABR, ABS, ABT
2016	NBV, NBW, NBX; NCC, NCD, NCE, NCF, NCG, NCH, NCI, NCJ, NCK, NCX, NCY, NCZ; NDB, NDC, NDD, NDE, NDF, NDG, NDH, NDQ, NDR, NDS, NDT, NDU, NDV, NDW, NDX, NDY, NDZ; NVA 1001*, NVB 1001* (Updated features)
2017	NAB, NAC, NAD, NAE, NAF, NAG, NAH, NAL, NAR, NAS, NAT, NAU, NAV, NAW, NAZ; NBA, NBB, NBI, NBJ, NBL, NBM, NBN, NBU, NBV, NBX, NBY, NBZ; NCB, NCC, NCN, NCO, NCP; NVC 1001*, NVD 1001*, NVE 1001*
2018	NAA, NAI, NAJ, NAK, NAM, NAO, NAP, NAQ, NAW, NAX, NAY, NAZ; NBA, NBB, NBC, NBD, NBE, NBF, NBG, NBK, NBP; NCA, NCL, NCM, NCQ, NCR, NCS, NCT, NCU, NCV, NCW, NCX; NVF 1001*, NVG 1001*, NVH 1001*
2019	NBH, NBO, NBQ, NBR, NBS, NBT; NDA, NDI, NDJ, NDK, NDL, NDM, NDN, NDO, NDP, NDQ; NEA, NEB, NEC, NED, NEG, NEH, NEI, NEJ; NVI 1001*, NVJ 1001*, NVK 1001*
2020	NAN; NEF, NEN, NEU; NFN, NFT, NFU, NFV, NFW, NFX, NFY, NFZ; NGA, NGD, NGF, NGG, NGH, NGJ, NGK, NGL, NGM, NGO, NGP, NGR; NVL 1001*, NVM 1001*, NVN 1001*
2021	NDO, NDZ; NEF, NEK, NEL, NEM, NEO, NEP, NEQ, NES, NET, NEV, NEW, NEX; NFC, NFI, NFQ; NGB, NGN, NGS, NGT, NGU, NGY; NHA; NVO 1001*, NVP 1001*, NVQ 1001*
2022	NEE, NEK, NEN, NER; NFD, NFE, NFG, NFH, NFJ, NFK, NFL, NFO, NFP; NGK, NGQ, NGX, NGY; NHB, NHC; NIB, NIC, NID, NIE, NIF; NVR 1001*, NVS 1001*, NVT 1001*
2023	NFA, NFB, NFC; NGC; NHA, NHD, NHE, NHF, NHI, NHJ, NHL; NIG, NIH, NII, NIJ, NIK, NIL, NIM, NIN, NIO, NIP, NIQ, NIR, NIS; NVU 1001*; NWA 1001*, NWB 1001*
2024	NEY, NEZ; NFF, NFM, NFN, NFR, NFS; NHG, NHH, NHK, NHL, NHM, NHN, NHO, NHQ, NHR, NHS, NHT, NHU; NIA, NIT, NIU; NJE; NKA, NKB, NKC, NKD, NKE, NKF, NKG, NKI, NKJ, NKK; NOA; NWC 1001*, NWD 1001*, NWE 1001*
2025	NGH, NHP; NJA, NJB, NJC, NJD, NJF, NJG, NJH, NJI, NJJ, NJK, NJL, NJM, NJQ, NJR; NKH, NKL, NKM, NKN, NKO, NKP, NKQ, NKR, NKS, NKT, NKU; NLA, NLB, NLC; NOA; NWJ 1001*, NWK 1001*, NWL 1001*, NWM 1001*
2026	NGE, NGI; NJN, NJO, NJP, NJS, NJT, NJU; NLD, NLE, NLF, NLG, NLH, NLI, NLJ, NLK, NLL, NLP, NLQ, NLR, NLS, NLT; NNA; NOA, NOB; NWF 1001*, NWG 1001*, NWH 1001, NWI 1001

*Vehicles registered from July 1, 2016, onwards are currently using private plates (white) since yellow plates are still in production. Note: Plate Numbers: with N P T U with V W X Y using the increments of I O Q are private plates.

=== Provincial ===
Public (plate series with approximate year issued):

Region and Year	Series issued
Region I (Ilocos Region) (1981–2014)	AVA-AVH, AVJ-AVN, AVP, AVR-AVZ, AWA-AWB (AWC-AWD has been used for special plates in NCR)
Region I (Ilocos Region) (2014–2015)	AAA, AAR, AAS, AAU; ABA, ALA, AVA; ABI (New series) (AWE-AWH, AWJ-AWL, AWP, AWR-AWZ series skipped)
Region I (Ilocos Region) (2016–Present*)	IAA-IAK; IBV, IBZ; ICC, ICL; IDI; IEE; IVA*, IVB* (Updated features)
C.A.R. (Cordillera Administrative Region) (2000–2014)	AYA-AYH, AYJ-AYN, AYP, AYR-AYV
C.A.R. (Cordillera Administrative Region) (2014–2015)	AAK, AAU; ADA; ABN (New series) (AYW-AYZ series skipped)
C.A.R. (Cordillera Administrative Region) (2016–Present*)	YAA-YAC; YCX; YVA* (Updated Features)
Region II (Cagayan Valley) (1981–2014)	BVA-BVH, BVJ-BVN, BVP, BVR-BVV
Region II (Cagayan Valley) (2014–2015)	AAA, AAT; AEA, ALA, AVA; ABI (New series) (BVW-BVZ series skipped)
Region II (Cagayan Valley) (2016–Present*)	BAA-BAJ; BBV, BBX, BBZ; BCL; BDI; BVA*, BVB* (Updated features)
Region III (Central Luzon) (1981–2014)	CVA-CVH, CVJ-CVN, CVP, CVR-CVZ, CWA-CWH, CXP CWJ-CWN, CWP, CWR-CWZ, CXA-CXH, CXJ-CXN, CXR-CXV
Region III (Central Luzon) (2014–2015)	AAB, AAQ, AAR, AAT, AAU, AAV; AFA, ALA, AMA, AVA; ABB, ABI (New series) (CXW-CXZ series skipped)
Region III (Central Luzon) (2016–Present*)	CAA-CAZ; CBA-CBU, CBX; CCA-CCU; CDA-CDG, CDI-CDK, CDZ; CVA*, CVB*, CVC*, CVD* (Updated features)
Region IV-A (Calabarzon)/Region IV-B (Mimaropa) (1981–2014)	DVA-DVH, DVJ-DVN, DVP, DVR-DVZ, DWA-DWH, DWJ-DWN, DWP, DWR-DWZ, DXA-DXH, DXJ-DXN, DXP, DXR-DXZ, DYA-DYD; VVA-VVD
Region IV-A (Calabarzon)/Region IV-B (Mimaropa) (2014–2015)	AAB, AAC, AAD, AAV, AAW; AEA, AWA, AXA; ABB, ABL; AAD (New series) (DYE-DYH, DYJ-DYN, DYP, DYR-DYZ; VVE-VVH, VVJ-VVN, VVP, VVR-VVZ series skipped)
Region IV-A (Calabarzon)/Region IV-B (Mimaropa) (2016–Present*)	DAA-DAV, DAX-DAZ; DBA-DBB, DBE-DBU, DBX-DBZ; DCA-DCK, DCP-DCR; DDL-DDM, DDZ; DEB; DVA*DVB*, DVC*; VAA-VAC; VBI; VCR; VDM; VEB; VVA*, VVB* (Updated features)
Region V (Bicol Region) (1981–2014)	EVA-EVH, EVJ-EVN, EVP, EVR-EVW (Used Only In Jeepneys and Buses)
Region V (Bicol Region) (2014–2015)	AAD; ABA, AFA, AGA, AMA, AXA; ABL (New series) (EVX-EVZ series skipped)
Region V (Bicol Region) (2016–Present*)	EAA-EAO; EBY; ECR; EDM; EVA*, EVB* (Updated features)
Region VI (Western Visayas) (1981–2014)	FVA-FVH, FVJ-FVN, FVP, FVR-FVZ, FWA-FWH, FWJ-FWN, FWP, FWR-FWZ, FXA-FXF
Region VI (Western Visayas) (2014–2015)	AAD, AAR; ABA, AGA, AMA, ANA, AXA; ABM (New series) (FXG-FXH, FXJ-FXN, FXP, FXR-FXZ series skipped)
Region VI (Western Visayas) (2016–Present*)	FAA-FAU; FBA-FBH, FBY; FCB, FCR-FCS; FDM; FVA*, FVB*, FVC* (Updated features)
Region VII (Central Visayas) (1981–2014)	GVA-GVH, GVJ-GVN, GVP, GVR-GVZ, GWA-GWH, GWJ-GWN, GWP, GWR-GWZ, GXA-GXH, GXJ-GXN, GXP, GXR-GXW (GXX-GXZ series skipped)
Region VII (Central Visayas) (2014–2015)	AAD, AAE, AAF, AAZ; AFA, AXA; ABM, ABN (New series) (GYA-GYZ series skipped)
Region VII (Central Visayas) (2016–Present*)	GAA-GAZ; GBA-GBS, GBY; GCS; GDM-GDN; GEB-GEE; GVA*, GVB*, GVC*, GVD*, GVE*, GVF'* (Updated features)
Region VIII (Eastern Visayas) (1981–2014)	HVA-HVH, HVJ-HVN, HVP, HVR-HVU
Region VIII (Eastern Visayas) (2014–2015)	AAF, AAW; ABA, AFA; ABN (New series) (HVV-HVZ series skipped)
Region VIII (Eastern Visayas) (2016–Present*)	HAA-HAJ; HCT; HEC; HVA*, HVB*, HVC* (Updated features)
Region IX (Zamboanga Peninsula and BARMM) (1981–2014)	JVA-JVH, JVJ-JVN
Region IX (Zamboanga Peninsula and BARMM) (2014–2015)	AAF, AAR, AAT; AFA, ANA, AXA; ABU (New series) (JVP, JVR-JVZ series skipped)
Region IX (Zamboanga Peninsula and BARMM) (2016–Present*)	JAA-JAU; JBA-JBD, JBG-JBJ; JCT-JCU; JDN-JDO; JVA*, JVB* (Updated features)
Region X (Northern Mindanao) (1981–2014)	KVA-KVH, KVJ-KVN, KVP, KVR-KVZ, KWA-KWB
Region X (Northern Mindanao) (2014–2015)	AAF, AAR, AAS, AAU; AFA, ANA; ABB, ABC (New series) (KWC-KWH, KWJ-KWN, KWP, KWR-KWZ series skipped)
Region X (Northern Mindanao) (2016–Present*)	KAA-KAU; KBA-KBN, KBY; KCB, KCU; KDO; KVA*, KVB* (Updated features)
Region XI (Davao Region and Caraga) (1981–2014)	LVA-LVH, LVJ-LVN, LVP, LVR-LVZ, LWA-LWH, LWJ-LWN, LWP, LWR-LWZ, LXA-LXE
Region XI (Davao Region) (2014–2015)	AAF, AAG, AAH (New series) (LXF-LXH, LXJ-LXN, LXP, LXR-LXZ series skipped)
Region XI (Davao Region) (2016–Present*)	LAA-LAU; LBA; LCD, LCU-LCV; LDP; LEC; LVA*, LVB*, LVC*, LVD* (Updated features)
Region XII (Soccsksargen) (1981–2014)	MVA-MVH, MVJ-MVN, MVP, MVR-MVZ, MWA-MWC
Region XII (Soccsksargen) (2014–2015)	AAH, AAS, AAT, AAU; ABA, AGA, ANA, AOA; ABC, ABU, ABV (New series) (MWD-MWH, MWJ-MWN, MWP, MWR-MWZ series skipped)
Region XII (Soccsksargen) (2016–Present*)	MAA-MAZ; MBA-MBO, MBQ-MBS, MBY-MBZ; MCB-MCC, MCV-MCX; MDP-MDQ; MVA*, MVB* (Updated features)
Region XIII (Caraga) (2007–2014)	LYA-LYH, LYJ-LYK
Region XIII (Caraga) (2014–2015)	AAL, AAU; ADA, AFA; ABB, ABC (New series) (LYL-LYN, LYP, LYR-LYZ series skipped)
Region XIII (Caraga) (2016–Present*)	ZAA-ZAJ; ZCC, ZCX; ZVA*, ZVB* (Updated features)

*Vehicles registered from July 1, 2016, onwards currently uses private plates (white) since yellow plates are in production.

== Regional issued trailer plates ==
=== Metro Manila ===
Year	Series issued
1981–2014	NUA-NUH, NUJ-NUN, NUP, NUR-NUZ; PUA-PUH, PUJ-PUN, PUP, PUR-PUZ; TUA-TUF
2014–2016	(TUG-TUH, TUJ-TUN, TUP, TUR-TUZ series skipped); AUA, BUA (New plate series)
2016–present*	NUA-NUE (Updated features)

*Trailer Plates with increments of "I", "O", and "Q" series were commonly used for private vehicles from 2009 to 2014.

=== Provincial ===
Region	Year	Series issued
Region I	1981–2014	AUA-AUD
Region I	2014–2016	(AUE-AUH, AUJ-AUN, AUP, AUR-AUZ series skipped); AUA (New plate series)
Region I	2016–present*	IUA (Updated features)
C.A.R.	2016–present*	YUA (Updated features)
Region II	1981–2014	BUA-BUH
Region II	2014–2016	(BUJ-BUN, BUP, BUR-BUZ series skipped); AUA, BUA (New plate series)
Region II	2016–present*	BUA (Updated features)
Region III	1981–2014	CUA-CUH, CUJ-CUN, CUP, CUR-CUX
Region III	2014–2016	(CUY-CUZ series skipped); AUA, BUA (New plate series)
Region III	2016–present*	CUA-CUB (Updated features)
Region IV	1981–2014 (Region IV-A)	DUA-DUH, DUJ-DUN, DUP
Region IV	2014–2016 (Region IV-A)	(DUR-DUZ series skipped); BUA (New plate series)
Region IV	2016–present* (Region IV-A)	DUA-DUB (Updated features)
Region IV	1981–2014 (Region IV-B)	VUA-VUH
Region IV	2014–2016 (Region IV-B)	(VUJ-VUN, VUP, VUR-VUZ series skipped); BUA (New plate series)
Region IV	2016–present* (Region IV-B)	VUA (Updated features)
Region V	1981–2014	EUA-EUB
Region V	2014–2016	(EUC-EUH, EUJ-EUN, EUP, EUR-EUZ series skipped); AUA, BUA (New plate series)
Region V	2016–present*	EUA (Updated features)
Region VI	1981–2014	FUA-FUE
Region VI	2014–2016	(FUF-FUH, FUJ-FUN, FUP, FUR-FUZ series skipped); AUA, BUA (New plate series)
Region VI	2016–present*	FUA (Updated features)
Region VII	1981–2014	GUA-GUH, GUJ-GUK
Region VII	2014–2016	(GUL-GUN, GUP, GUR-GUZ series skipped); AUA, BUA (New plate series)
Region VII	2016–present*	GUA (Updated features)
Region VIII	1981–2014	HUA-HUB
Region VIII	2014–2016	(HUC-HUH, HUJ-HUN, HUP, HUR-HUZ series skipped); AUA, BUA (New plate series)
Region VIII	2016–present*	HUA (Updated features)
Region IX/BARMM	1981–2014	JUA-JUD
Region IX/BARMM	2014–2016	(JUE-JUH, JUJ-JUN, JUP, JUR-JUZ series skipped); AUA, BUA (New plate series)
Region IX/BARMM	2016–present*	JUA (Updated features)
Region X	1981–2014	KUA-KUH
Region X	2014–2016	(KUJ-KUN, KUP, KUR-KUZ series skipped); AUA, BUA (New plate series)
Region X	2016–present*	KUA (Updated features)
Region XI	1981–2014	LUA-LUF
Region XI	2014–2016	(LUG-LUH, LUJ-LUL, LUN, LUP, LUR-LUZ series skipped); AUA, BUA (New plate series)
Region XI	2016–present*	LUA (Updated features)
Region XII	1981–2014	MUA-MUG
Region XII	2014–2016	(MUH, MUJ-MUN, MUP, MUR-MUZ series skipped); AUA, BUA (New plate series)
Region XII	2016–present*	MUA (Updated features)
Region XIII	1981–2014	LUM
Region XIII	2014–2016	AUA, BUA (New plate series)
Region XIII	2016–present*	ZUA (Updated features)

=== Yellow Plates in Metro Manila and Provincial ===
Metro Manila

Year	Series issued
1981–2014	NZA-NZG (NZH, NZJ-NZN, NZP, NZR-NZZ series skipped)
2016–present*	NZA-NZB (New series)

Provincial

Region	Year	Series issued
Region I	1981–2014	AZA-AZB (AZC-AZH, AZJ-AZN, AZP, AZR-AZZ series skipped)
Region I	2016–present*	IZA (New series)
C.A.R	2016–present*	YZA (New series)
Region II	1981–2014	BZA-BZD (BZE-BZH, BZJ-BZN, BZP, BZR-BZZ series skipped)
Region II	2016–present*	BZA (New series)
Region III	1981–2014	CZA-CZB (CZC-CZH, CZJ-CZN, CZP, CZR-CZZ series skipped)
Region III	2016–present*	CZA (New series)
Region IV-A/Region IV-B	1981–2014	DZA-DZE (DZF-DZH, DZJ-DZN, DZP, DZR-DZZ series skipped)
Region IV-A/Region IV-B	2016–present*	DZA (New series)
Region V	1981–2014	EZA (EZB-EZH, EZJ-EZN, EZP, EZR-EZZ series skipped)
Region V	2016–present*	EZA (New series)
Region VI	1981–2014	FZA-FZC (FZD-FZH, FZJ-FZN, FZP, FZR-FZZ series skipped)
Region VI	2016–present*	FZA (New series)
Region VII	1981–2014	GZA (GZB-GZH, GZJ-GZN, GZP, GZR-GZZ series skipped)
Region VII	2016–present*	GZA (New series)
Region VIII	1981–2014	HZA-HZF (HZG-HZH, HZJ-HZN, HZP, HZR-HZZ series skipped)
Region VIII	2016–present*	HZA (New series)
Region IX/BARMM	1981–2014	JZA (JZB-JZH, JZJ-JZN, JZP, JZR-JZZ series skipped)
Region IX/BARMM	2016–present*	JZA (New series)
Region X	1981–2014	KZA-KZE (KZF-KZH, KZJ-KZN, KZP, KZR-KZZ series skipped)
Region X	2016–present*	KZA (New series)
Region XI	1981–2014	LZA (LZB-LZH, LZJ-LZL, LZN, LZP, LZR-LZZ series skipped)
Region XI	2016–present*	LZA (New series)
Region XII	1981–2014	MZA-MZB (MZC-MZH, MZJ-MZN, MZP, MZR-MZZ series skipped)
Region XII	2016–present*	MZA (New series)
Region XIII	2007–2014	LZM
Region XIII	2016–present*	ZZA (New series)

*Public Trailers registered from 2016 onwards currently use 6-Numbered plates as trailer plates are not yet in production.

== Government-owned issued plates ==
Government (plate series with approximate year issued):

Year	Series issued
1981	SAA-SAH, SAJ-SAN
1982	SAP, SAR-SAZ
1983	SBA-SBE
1984	SBF-SBH, SBJ-SBK
1985	SBL-SBN, SBP, SBR-SBT
1986	SBU-SBW
1987	SBX-SBZ, SCA-SCB
1988	SCC-SCH, SCJ-SCL
1989	SCM-SCN, SCP, SCR-SCT
1990	SCU-SCZ
1991	SDA-SDE
1992	SDF-SDH, SDJ-SDL
1993	SDM-SDN, SDP, SDR-SDT
1994	SDU-SDZ, SEA-SEB
1995	SEC-SEH, SEJ-SEL
1996	SEM-SEN, SEP, SER-SET
1997	SEU-SEZ, SFA-SFB
1998	SFC-SFF
1999	SFG-SFH, SFJ-SFL
2000	SFM-SFN, SFP, SFR-SFZ
2001	SGA-SGF
2002	SGG-SGH, SGJ-SGN
2003	SGP, SGR-SGW
2004	SGX-SGZ, SHA-SHE
2005	SHF-SHH, SHJ-SHL
2006	SHM-SHN, SHP, SHR-SHT
2007	SHU-SHZ, SJA-SJD
2008	SJE-SJH, SJJ-SJN
2009	SJP, SJR-SJV
2010	SJW-SJZ, SKA-SKD
2011	SKE-SKH, SKJ-SKN
2012	SKP, SKR-SKU
2013	SKV-SKZ, SLA-SLD
2014	SLE-SLH; (SLJ-SLN, SLP, SLR-SLZ series skipped); SAA 1001 (New series)
2015	SAA 6001
2016–2019	SAB 1001 (Updated features)

Note: Government plate numbers from SLJ-101 (including increments of "I", "O" and "Q") up to SZZ-999 were skipped.

Government (new plate series with approximate region and year issued):

Metro Manila

Year	Series issued
2019–present*	SNA 1001, SNB 1001, SNC 1001, SND 1001, SNE 1001, SNG 1001, SNH 1001, SNI 1001, SNJ 1001, SNK 1001, SNL 1001, SNM 1001, SNN 1001 (Updated series)

Provincial

Region	Year	Series issued
Region I	2019–present*	SAC 1001, SAD 1001
C.A.R.	2019–present*	SYA 1001
Region II	2019–present*	SBA 1001, SBB 1001
Region III	2019–present*	SCA 1001, SCB 1001, SCC 1001, SCD 1001, SCE 1001
Region IV-A	2019–present*	SDA 1001, SDB 1001, SDC 1001
Region IV-B	2019–present*	SVA 1001
Region V	2019–present*	SEA 1001, SEB 1001
Region VI	2019–present*	SFA 1001, SFB 1001
Region VII	2019–present*	SGA 1001, SGB 1001, SGC 1001
Region VIII	2019–present*	SHA 1001
Region IX/BARMM	2019–present*	SJA 1001, SJB 1001
Region X	2019–present*	SKA 1001, SKB 1001
Region XI	2019–present*	SLA 1001, SLB 1001
Region XII	2019–present*	SMA 1001, SMB 1001
Region XIII	2019–present*	SZA 1001 (Updated series)

== Other special issued vehicle plates ==
=== Electric ===
Metro Manila

Year	Series issued
2007–2014	ZZI 101
2023–present*	NHV 1001, NHW 1001, NHX 1001, NHY 1001, NHZ 1001; NIV 1001, NIW 1001, NIX 1001, NIZ 1001; NJV 1001, NJW 1001, NJY 1001, NJZ 1001; NMV 1001 (Updated features)

Provincial

Region	Year	Series issued
Region I	2023–present*	IAV 1001
C.A.R.	2023–present*	YAV 1001
Region II	2023–present*	BAV 1001
Region III	2023–present*	CBV 1001, CBY 1001, CCV 1001
Region IV-A	2023–present*	DAW 1001, DBV 1001
Region IV-B	2023–present*	VAV 1001
Region V	2023–present*	EAV 1001
Region VI	2023–present*	FAV 1001, FAW 1001
Region VII	2023–present*	GBV 1001, GBW 1001
Region VIII	2023–present*	HAV 1001
Region IX/BARMM	2023–present*	JAV 1001, JAY 1001
Region X	2023–present*	KAV 1001
Region XI	2023–present*	LAV 1001, LAW 1001
Region XII	2023–present*	MBV 1001, MBW 1001
Region XIII	2023–present*	ZAV 1001 (Updated features)

=== Hybrid ===
Metro Manila

Year	Series issued
2023–present*	NNV 1001, NNW 1001, NNX 1001, NNY 1001, NNZ 1001; NOV 1001, NOW 1001, NOX 1001, NOY 1001, NOZ 1001; NPW 1001, NPX 1001, NPY 1001, NPZ 1001; NQV 1001; NTV 1001 (Updated features)

Provincial

Region	Year	Series issued
Region I	2023–present*	INV 1001, INX 1001, INY, 1001, INZ 1001
C.A.R.	2023–present*	YNV 1001
Region II	2023–present*	BNV 1001, BNW 1001
Region III	2023–present*	CNV 1001, CNW 1001, CNY 1001; COV 1001
Region IV-A	2023–present*	DNV 1001, DNW 1001; DOV 1001
Region IV-B	2023–present*	VNV 1001, VNW 1001
Region V	2023–present*	ENV 1001, ENW 1001
Region VI	2023–present*	FNV 1001, FNW 1001
Region VII	2023–present*	GNV 1001, GNW 1001, GNX 1001; GOW 1001
Region VIII	2023–present*	HNV 1001
Region IX/BARMM	2023–present*	JNV 1001, JNW 1001
Region X	2023–present*	KNV 1001, KNW 1001
Region XI	2023–present*	LNV 1001, LNW 1001
Region XII	2023–present*	MNV 1001
Region XIII	2023–present*	ZNV 1001 (Updated features)

*Note: Electric, and hybrid vehicles plates first letter will still indicate the region of where the vehicle is registered. Electric vehicle plates second letter will be from A to M, while the third letter will be the following; V W X Y Z. Hybrid vehicle plates second letter will be from N to Z, while the third letter will be the following; V W X Y Z. Electric and Hybrid vehicle plates will have the green color code scheme.

=== Vintage Vehicle ===
Metro Manila

Year	Series issued
2023–present*	NTX 1001 (New plate series)

Provincial

Region	Year	Series issued
Region I	2023–present*	ITX 1001
C.A.R.	2023–present*	YTX 1001
Region II	2023–present*	BTX 1001
Region III	2023–present*	CTX 1001
Region IV-A	2023–present*	DTX 1001
Region IV-B	2023–present*	VTX 1001
Region V	2023–present*	ETX 1001
Region VI	2023–present*	FTX 1001
Region VII	2023–present*	GTX 1001
Region VIII	2023–present*	HTX 1001
Region IX/BARMM	2023–present*	JTX 1001
Region X	2023–present*	KTX 1001
Region XI	2023–present*	LTX 1001
Region XII	2023–present*	MTX 1001
Region XIII	2023–present*	ZTX 1001 (Updated features)

*Note: Vintage vehicle plates first letter will still indicate the region of where the vehicle is registered. The second letter will be T while the third letter will be X Y Z. The vintage vehicle plate will contain the words "Vintage Vehicle" alongside the vehicle model year at the bottom of the plate.

== Regional issued motorcycle plates ==
=== Metro Manila ===
- Private Motorcycle (MC):

Year	Series issued
1981–1989	NA-NH, NJ-NN, NP
1990–1999	NR-NT; PA-PH; TA-TB
2000–2009	PJ-PN, PP, PR-PU; TC-TH, TJ-TN, TP, TR-TU; UA-UH, UJ-UN, UP, UR-UU; NI, NO, NQ; PI, PO, PQ; TI, TO, TQ; XI, XO, XQ; ZJ-ZN, ZP, ZR, ZS NA-NU; PA-PU (Inverted motorcycle plates series)
2010–2014	TA-TU; UA-UU; XA-XC, XX-XZ
2014–2017	PV-PW; TY-TZ; UV-UZ; SP, SV-SW (Special motorcycle plate series); NA, NC-NH (New plate series)
2018–present	NAA-NAZ, NBA-NBZ, NCA-NCZ, NDA-NDZ, NEA-NEZ, NFA-NFZ, NGA-NGZ, NHA-NHZ, NIA-NIZ, NJA-NJZ, NKA-NKZ, NLA-NLZ, NMA-NMZ, NNA-NNZ, NOA-NOZ, NPA-NPZ, NQA-NQZ, NRA-NRZ, NSA-NSZ, NTA-NTZ, NUA-NUZ, NVA-NVZ, NWA-NWZ, NXA-NXZ, NYA-NYZ, NZA-NZZ; PAA-PAZ, PBA-PBZ, PCA-PCZ, PDA-PDZ, PEA-PEZ, PFA-PFZ, PGA-PGZ, PHA-PHZ, PIA-PIZ, PJA-PJZ, PKA-PKZ, PLA-PLZ, PMA-PMZ, PNA-PNZ, POA-POZ, PPA-PPZ, PQA-PQZ, PRA-PRZ, PSA-PSZ, PTA-PTZ, PUA-PUZ, PVA-PVZ, PWA-PWZ, PXA-PXZ, PYA-PYZ, PZA-PZZ; QAA-QAZ, QBA-QBZ, QCA-QCZ, QDA-QDZ, QEA-QEZ, QFA-QFZ, QGA-QGZ, QHA-QHZ, QIA-QIZ, QJA-QJZ, QKA-QKZ, QLA-QLZ, QMA-QMZ, QNA-QNZ, QOA-QOZ, QPA-QPZ, QQA-QQZ, QRA-QRZ, QSA-QSZ, QTA-QTZ, QUA-QUZ, QVA-QVZ, QWA-QWZ, QXA-QXZ, QYA-QYZ, QZA-QZZ; TAA-TAZ, TBA-TBZ, TCA-TCZ, TDA-TDZ, TEA-TEZ, TFA-TFZ, TGA-TGZ, THA-THZ, TIA-TIZ, TJA-TJZ, TKA-TKZ, TLA-TLZ, TMA-TMZ, TNA-TNZ, TOA-TOZ, TPA-TPZ, TQA-TQZ, TRA-TRZ, TSA-TSZ, TTA-TTZ, TUA-TUZ, TVA-TVZ, TWA-TWZ, TXA-TXZ, TYA-TYZ, TZA-TZZ; UAA-UAZ, UBA-UBZ, UCA-UCZ, UDA-UDZ, UEA-UEZ, UFA-UFZ, UGA-UGZ, UHA-UHZ, UIA-UIZ, UJA-UJZ, UKA-UKZ, ULA-ULZ, UMA-UMZ, UNA-UNZ, UOA-UOZ, UPA-UPZ, UQA-UQZ, URA-URZ, USA-USZ, UTA-UTZ, UUA-UUZ, UVA-UVZ, UWA-UWZ, UXA-UXZ, UYA-UYZ, UZA-UZZ; XAA-XAZ, XBA-XBZ, XCA-XCZ, XDA-XDZ, XEA-XEZ, XFA-XFZ, XGA-XGZ, XHA-XHZ, XIA-XIZ, XJA-XJZ, XKA-XKZ, XLA-XLZ, XMA-XMZ, XNA-XNZ, XOA-XOZ, XPA-XPZ, XQA-XQZ, XRA-XRZ, XSA-XSZ, XTA-XTZ, XUA-XUZ, XVA-XVZ, XWA-XWZ, XXA-XXZ, XYA-XYZ, XZA-XZZ (Updated features for inverted motorcycle and tricycle plates series, in white background)
2024–present*	N-123-AA-AZ, N-123-BA-BZ, N-123-CA-CZ, N-123-DA-DZ, N-123-EA-EZ, N-123-FA-FZ, N-123-GA-GZ, N-123-HA-HZ, N-123-IA-IZ, N-123-JA-JZ, N-123-KA-KZ, N-123-LA-LZ, N-123-MA-MZ, N-123-NA-NZ, N-123-OA-OZ, N-123-PA-PZ, N-123-QA-QZ, N-123-RA-RZ, N-123-SA-SZ, N-123-TA-TW, N-123-UA-UW; P-123-AA-AZ, P-123-BA-BZ, P-123-CA-CZ, P-123-DA-DZ, P-123-EA-EZ, P-123-FA-FZ, P-123-GA-GZ, P-123-HA-HZ, P-123-IA-IZ, P-123-JA-JZ, P-123-KA-KZ, P-123-LA-LZ, P-123-MA-MZ, P-123-NA-NZ, P-123-OA-OZ, P-123-PA-PZ, P-123-QA-QZ, P-123-RA-RZ, P-123-SA-SZ, P-123-TA-TW, P-123-UA-UZ (Updated features for new motorcycle and tricycle plate series, in white background)

- Private Motor Tricycle (TC):

Year	Series issued
2014***	NO 10001 (New plate series)
2015-2017***	NO 50001
2018–present	N-1234-A-N-1234-Z; P-1234-A-P-1234-Z; Q-1234-A-Q-1234-Z; T-1234-A-T-1234-Z; U-1234-A-U-1234-Z; X-1234-A-X-1234-Z (Updated features for new modified tricycle plate series, in white background)
2018–present	N-0-A-123-N-0-Z-123, N-1-A-123-N-1-Z-123, N-2-A-123-N-2-Z-123; P-0-A-123-P-0-Z-123, P-1-A-123-P-1-Z-123; Q-0-A-123-Q-0-Z-123, Q-1-A-122-Q-1-A-123 (Updated features for new modified tricycle plate series, in white background)

- Public Motor Tricycle (TC):

Year	Series issued
1981–1989	NV-NZ
1990–1999	PV-PZ; TV-TZ
2000–2009	UV-UX; XH, XJ-XL
2010–2014	UY-UZ; WZ; NV-NW (Inverted motorcycle plates series)
2014–2017***	NB (New plate series)
2018–present**	NA-NZ; PA-PZ; QA-QZ; TA-TZ; UA-UZ; XA-XR (Updated features for tricycle plates series in yellow background)
2025-present**	1-NA-234-1-NZ-234 (Updated features for modified tricycle plates series in yellow background)

* Format DDD-LLL (e.g. 123-NAA & 456-NOA)
** Format L-DDD-LL (e.g. N-123-AA & N-456-OA)
*** Format L-DDDD-L (e.g. N-1234-A & N-5678-O)
**** Format LL-DDDD (e.g. NA-1234 & NO-5678)
***** Format D-LL-DDD (e.g. 1-NA-234 & 5-NO-678)

=== Provincial ===
- Private Motorcycle (MC):

Region	Year	Series issued
Region I/C.A.R.	1981–2014***	AA-AH, AJ-AN, AP-AR; YV; AI, AO, AQ; IG, IH, IW, IX; OL, OQ, ZA-ZI, ZO, ZQ, ZT, ZU; AA-AU; ZA-ZZ, JV; KW; PZ, TW; IM, IO; QD, QG, QV; VT, VU; XG, XK; NX, SH, SI (Inverted motorcycle plates series); SI, SR (Special motorcycle plate series)
Region I/C.A.R.	2014–2017***	AA, AC-AE, AU (New plate series)
Region I	2018–2026	AAA-AAZ, ABA-ABZ, ACA-ACZ, ADA-ADZ, AFA-AFZ, AGA-AGZ, AHA-AHZ, AIA-AIZ, AJA-AJZ, AKA-AKZ, ALA-ALZ, AMA-AMZ, ANA-ANZ, AOA-AOZ, APA-APZ, AQA-AQZ, ARA-ARZ, ASA-ASZ, ATA-ATZ, AUA-AUZ, AVA-AVZ, AWA-AWZ, AXA-AXZ, AYA-AYZ, AZA-AZZ; IAA-IAZ, IBA-IBZ, ICA-ICZ, IDA-IDZ, IEA-IEZ, IFA-IFZ, IGA-IGZ, IHA-IHZ, IIA-IIZ, IJA-IJZ, IKA-IKZ, ILA-ILZ, IMA-IMZ, INA-INZ, IOA-IOZ, IPA-IPZ, IQA-IQZ, IRA-IRZ, ISA-ISZ, ITA-ITZ, IUA-IUZ, IVA-IVZ, IWA-IWZ, IXA-IXZ, IYA-IYZ, IZA-IZZ (Updated features for inverted motorcycle and tricycle plates series, in white background with green color strip on top)
Region I	2026–present*	A-123-AA-AZ, A-123-BA-BZ, A-123-CA-CZ, A-123-DA-DZ, A-123-EA-EZ (Updated features for new motorcycle and tricycle plates series, in white background with green color strip on top)
C.A.R.	2016–present*	YAA-YAZ, YBA-YBZ, YCA-YCZ, YDA-YDZ, YEA-YEZ, YFA-YFZ, YGA-YGZ, YHA-YHZ, YIA-YIZ, YJA-YJZ, YKA-YKZ, YLA-YLZ, YMA-YMZ, YNA-YNZ (Updated features for inverted motorcycle and tricycle plates series, in white background with pink color strip on top)
Region II	1981–2014***	BA-BH, BJ-BL; YJ; IH, IK, IQ, IU, OE, OM; BA-BU; YM, YN, YW; IR, IS; OW-OZ; XL; QI, QJ; BY, BZ, JV; KX; PY; TX; VU; SJ, SS, ST (Inverted motorcycle plates series); SR; XX (special motorcycle plate series)
Region II	2014-2017***	BA, BC-BF (New plate series)
Region II	2018–2023	BAA-BAZ, BBA-BBZ, BCA-BCZ, BDA-BDZ, BEA-BEZ, BFA-BFZ, BGA-BGZ, BHA-BHZ, BIA-BIZ, BJA-BJZ, BKA-BKZ, BLA-BLZ, BMA-BMZ, BNA-BNZ, BOA-BOZ, BPA-BPZ, BQA-BQZ, BRA-BRZ, BSA-BSZ, BTA-BTZ, BUA-BUZ, BVA-BVZ, BWA-BWZ, BXA-BXZ, BYA-BYZ, BZA-BZZ (Updated features for inverted motorcycle and tricycle plates series, in white background with red color strip on top)
Region II	2023–2025*	B-123-AA-AZ, B-123-BA-BZ, B-123-CA-CZ, B-123-DA-DZ, B-123-EA-EZ, B-123-FA-FZ, B-123-GA-GZ, B-123-HA-HZ, B-123-IA-IZ, B-123-JA-JZ, B-123-KA-KZ, B-123-LA-LZ, B-123-MA-MZ, B-123-NA-NZ, B-123-OA-OZ, B-123-PA-PZ, B-123-QA-QZ, B-123-RA-RZ, B-123-SA-SZ, B-123-TA-TW, B-123-UA-UZ (Updated features for new motorcycle and tricycle plates series, in white background with red color strip on top)
Region II	2025–present*	BA-123-A-Z, BB-123-A-Z, BC-123-A-Z, BD-123-A-Z, BE-123-A-Z, BF-123-A-Z, BG-123-A-Z, BH-123-A-Z, BI-123-A-Z, BJ-123-A-Z, BK-123-A-Z, BL-123-A-Z, BM-123-A-Z, BN-123-A-Z, BO-123-A-Z, BP-123-A-Z, BQ-123-A-Z, BR-123-A-Z, BS-123-A-Z, BT-123-A-W, BU-123-A-Z (Updated features for new motorcycle and tricycle plates series, in white background with red color strip on top)
Region III	1981–2014***	CA-CH, CJ-CN, CP, CR, CS; RA-RH, RP; YG, YH, YP, YR, YS, YX-YZ; EP; FP; HL-HM; KM, KN; CI, CO, CQ; RI, RO, RQ; IA, IB, IF, IR-IT, IY, IZ, OA, OB, OF, OH-OK ON-OP, OR-OZ; HU; MU; CA-CU; RA-RU, YN-YQ; IC-IF, II-IK, IT-IV; OD-OH; RY, RZ; XA-XC, XI, XJ, XM-XU, QA-QC, QF, QH, QW-QZ; RY, RZ; HO, HT, HV-HZ, JW; KY, KZ; NY, NZ; PX, TV; VL, VX-VZ; SD-SG, SX (Inverted motorcycle plates series); SN, SS; XS (special motorcycle plate series)
Region III	2014–2017***	CA, CC-CD (New plate series)
Region III	2018–2024	CAA-CAZ, CBA-CBZ, CCA-CCZ, CDA-CDZ, CEA-CEZ, CFA-CFZ, CGA-CGZ, CHA-CHZ, CIA-CIZ, CJA-CJZ, CKA-CKZ, CLA-CLZ, CMA-CMZ, CNA-CNZ, COA-COZ, CPA-CPZ, CQA-CQZ, CRA-CRZ, CSA-CSZ, CTA-CTZ, CUA-CUZ, CVA-CVZ, CWA-CWZ, CXA-CXZ, CYA-CYZ, CZA-CZZ; RAA-RAZ, RBA-RBZ, RCA-RCZ, RDA-RDZ, REA-REZ, RFA-RFZ, RGA-RGZ, RHA-RHZ, RIA-RIZ, RJA-RJZ, RKA-RKZ, RLA-RLZ, RMA-RMZ, RNA-RNZ, ROA-ROZ, RPA-RPZ, RQA-RQZ, RRA-RRZ, RSA-RSZ, RTA-RTZ, RUA-RUZ, RVA-RVZ, RWA-RWZ, RXA-RXZ, RYA-RYZ, RZA-RZZ; WAA-WAZ, WBA-WBZ, WCA-WCZ, WDA-WDZ, WEA-WEZ, WFA-WFZ, WGA-WGZ, WHA-WHZ, WIA-WIZ, WJA-WJZ, WKA-WKZ, WLA-WLZ, WMA-WMZ, WNA-WNZ, WOA-WOZ, WPA-WPZ, WQA-WQZ, WRA-WRZ, WSA-WSZ, WTA-WTZ, WUA-WUZ, WVA-WVZ, WWA-WWZ, WXA-WXZ, WYA-WYZ, WZA-WZZ (Updated features for inverted motorcycle and tricycle plates series, in blue color strip on top)
Region III	2023–present*	C-123-AA-AZ, C-123-BA-BZ, C-123-CA-CZ, C-123-DA-DZ, C-123-EA-EZ, C-123-FA-FZ, C-123-GA-GZ, C-123-HA-HZ, C-123-IA-IZ, C-123-JA-JZ, C-123-KA-KZ, C-123-LA-LZ, C-123-MA-MZ, C-123-NA-NZ, C-123-OA-OZ, C-123-PA-PZ, C-123-QA-QZ, C-123-RA-RZ, C-123-SA-SZ, C-123-TA-TW, C-123-UA-UZ; R-123-AA-AZ, R-123-BA-BZ, R-123-CA-CZ, R-123-FA-FZ, R-123-GA-GZ, R-123-HA-HZ, R-123-IA-IZ, R-123-JA-JZ, R-123-KA-KZ, R-123-LA-LZ, R-123-MA-MZ, R-123-NA-NZ, R-123-OA-OZ, R-123-PA-PZ, R-123-QA-QZ (Updated features for new motorcycle and tricycle plates series, in white with blue color strip on top); R-123-DA-DZ, R-123-EA-EZ (Updated features for new motorcycle and tricycle plates series, in white with green color strip on top)
Region IV	1981–2014 (Region IV-A/IV-B)	DA-DH, DJ-DN, DP, DR, DS; VA-VH; HK; DI, DO, DQ; WA-WH, WJ-WN; VI, VO, VQ; WI, WO, WQ; DA-DU, VA-VJ; OM-ON, WA-WU; WV-WZ; LV; VM-VS; SL-SN (Inverted motorcycle plates series)
Region IV	2014–2017 (Region IV-A/IV-B)	DA, DC-DE, DS, DT (New plate series)
Region IV	2018-2023 (Region IV-A)	DAA-DAZ, DBA-DBZ, DCA-DCZ, DDA-DDZ, DEA-DEZ, DFA-DFZ, DGA-DGZ, DHA-DHZ, DIA-DIZ, DJA-DJZ, DKA-DKH, DLA-DLZ, DMA-DMZ, DNA-DNZ, DOA-DOZ, DPA-DPZ, DQA-DQZ, DRA-DRZ, DSA-DSZ, DTA-DTZ, DUA-DUZ, DVA-DVZ, DWA-DWZ, DXA-DXZ, DYA-DYZ, DZA-DZZ; OAA-OAZ, OBA-OBZ, OCA-OCZ, ODA-ODZ, OEA-OEZ, OFA-OFZ, OGA-OGZ, OHA-OHZ, OIA-OIZ, OJA-OJZ, OKA-OKZ, OLA-OLZ, OMA-OMZ, ONA-ONZ, OOA-OOZ, OPA-OPZ, OQA-OQZ, ORA-ORZ, OSA-OSZ, OTA-OTZ, OUA-OUZ, OVA-OVZ, OWA-OWZ, OXA-OXZ, OYA-OYZ, OZA-OZZ* (Updated features for inverted motorcycle and tricycle plates series, in white background with purple color strip on top)
Region IV	2018-2025 (Region IV-B)	VAA-VAZ, VBA-VBZ, VCA-VCZ, VDA-VDZ, VEA-VEZ, VFA-VFZ, VGA-VGZ, VHA-VHZ, VIA-VIZ, VJA-VJZ, VKA-VKZ, VLA-VLZ, VMA-VMZ, VNA-VNZ, VOA-VOZ, VPA-VPZ, VQA-VQZ, VRA-VRZ, VSA-VSZ, VTA-VTZ, VUA-VUZ, VVA-VVZ, VWA-VWZ, VXA-VXZ, VYA-VYZ, VZA-VZZ (Updated features for inverted motorcycle and tricycle plates series, in white background with orange color strip on top)
Region IV	2023–present* (Region IV-A)	D-123-AA-AZ, D-123-BA-BZ, D-123-CA-CZ, D-123-DA-DZ, D-123-EA-EZ, D-123-FA-FZ, D-123-GA-GZ, D-123-HA-HZ, D-123-IA-IZ, D-123-JA-JZ, D-123-KA-KZ, D-123-LA-LZ, D-123-MA-MZ, D-123-NA-NZ, D-123-OA-OZ, D-123-PA-PZ, D-123-QA-QZ, D-123-RA-RZ, D-123-SA-SZ, D-123-TA-TW, D-123-UA-UZ; O-123-AA-AZ, O-123-BA-BZ, O-123-CA-CZ, O-123-DA-DZ, O-123-EA-EZ, O-123-FA-FZ, O-123-GA-GZ, O-123-HA-HZ, O-123-IA-IZ, O-123-JA-JZ, O-123-KA-KZ, O-123-LA-LZ, O-123-MA-MZ, O-123-NA-NZ, O-123-OA-OZ, O-123-PA-PZ, O-123-QA-QZ, O-123-RA-RZ, O-123-SA-SZ, O-123-TA-TW, O-123-UA-UZ (Updated features for new motorcycle and tricycle plates series, in white background with purple color strip on top)
Region IV	2026-present (Region IV-A)	DA-123-A-Z, DB-123-A-Z, DC-123-A-Z, DD-123-A-Z (Updated features for new modified motorcycle and tricycle plates series, in white background with purple color strip on top)
Region IV	2026-present (Region IV-A)	1-DAA-23-1-DAZ-23, 1-DBA-23-1-DBZ-23 (Updated features for new modified motorcycle and tricycle plates series, in white background with purple color strip on top)
Region IV	2025–present* (Region IV-B)	V-123-BA-BZ, V-123-CA-CZ, V-123-DA-DZ (Updated features for new motorcycle and tricycle plates series, in orange color strip on top.); V-123-AA-AZ (Updated features for new modified motorcycle and tricycle plates series, in white background with purple color strip on top)
Region V	1981–2014***	EA-EH, EJ-EN, ER; YK, YL; EI, EO, EQ; IG; OD, OG; EA-EU; IA, IB, IQ, IW; OA, OS, OT; XD, XE, XF; QE, QK, QL; EY, EZ; SC, SK, SY, SZ (Inverted motorcycle plates series); XT (Special motorcycle plate series)
Region V	2014–2017***	EA, EC, ED (New plate series)
Region V	2018–2023	EAA-EAZ, EBA-EBZ, ECA-ECZ, EDA-EDZ, EEA-EEZ, EFA-EFZ, EGA-EGZ, EHA-EHZ, EIA-EIZ, EJA-EJZ, EKA-EKZ, ELA-ELZ, EMA-EMZ, ENA-ENZ, EOA-EOZ, EPA-EPZ, EQA-EQZ, ERA-ERZ, ESA-ESZ, ETA-ETZ, EUA-EUZ, EVA-EVZ, EWA-EWZ, EXA-EXZ, EYA-EYZ, EZA-EZZ (Updated features for inverted motorcycle and tricycle plates series, in white background with gray color strip on top)
Region V	2023–present*	E-123-AA-AZ, E-123-BA-BZ, E-123-CA-CZ, E-123-DA-DZ, E-123-EA-EZ, E-123-FA-FZ, E-123-GA-GZ, E-123-HA-HZ, E-123-IA-IZ, E-123-JA-JZ, E-123-KA-KZ, E-123-LA-LZ, E-123-MA-MZ, E-123-NA-NZ, E-123-OA-OZ, E-123-PA-PZ, E-123-QA-QZ, E-123-RA-RZ, E-123-SA-SZ, E-123-TA-TW, E-123-UA-UZ (Updated features for new motorcycle and tricycle plates series, in white background with gray color strip on top)
Region VI	1981–2014***	FA-FH, FJ-FN; FI, FO, FQ; OC, II, IJ, IV; FA-FU, IL, IX; OB, OU; QM, QN; FY, FZ; HQ, HR (Inverted motorcycle plates series)
Region VI	2014–2017***	FA, FC-FF (New plate series)
Region VI	2018–2023	FAA-FAZ, FBA-FBZ, FCA-FCZ, FDA-FDZ, FEA-FEZ, FFA-FFZ, FGA-FGZ, FHA-FHZ, FIA-FIZ, FJA-FJZ, FKA-FKZ, FLA-FLZ, FMA-FMZ, FNA-FNZ, FOA-FOZ, FPA-FPZ, FQA-FQZ, FRA-FRZ, FTA-FTZ, FUA-FUZ, FVA-FVZ, FWA-FWZ, FXA-FXZ, FYA-FYZ, FZA-FZZ (Updated features for inverted motorcycle and tricycle plates series, in white background with purple color strip on bottom)
Region VI	2023–2025*	F-123-AA-AZ, F-123-BA-BZ, F-123-CA-CZ, F-123-DA-DZ, F-123-EA-EZ; F-123-FA-FZ, F-123-GA-GZ, F-123-HA-HZ, F-123-IA-IZ, F-123-JA-JZ, F-123-KA-KZ, F-123-LA-LZ, F-123-MA-MZ, F-123-NA-NZ, F-123-QA-QZ, F-123-RA-RZ, F-123-SA-SZ, F-123-TA-TW, F-123-UA-UZ (Updated features for new motorcycle and tricycle plates series, in white background with purple color strip on bottom); F-123-OA-OZ, F-123-PA-PZ (Updated features for new motorcycle and tricycle plates series, in white background with green color strip on bottom)
Region VI	2025–present*	FA-123-A-Z, FB-123-A-Z, FC-123-A-Z, FD-123-A-Z, FE-123-A-Z, FF-123-A-Z, FG-123-A-Z, FH-123-A-Z, FI-123-A-Z, FJ-123-A-Z, FK-123-A-Z, FL-123-A-Z, FM-123-A-Z, FN-123-A-Z, FO-123-A-Z, FP-123-A-Z, FQ-123-A-Z, FR-123-A-Z, FS-123-A-Z, FT-123-A-W, FU-123-A-Z (Updated features for new motorcycle and tricycle plates series, in white background with purple color strip on bottom)
Region VI	2025-present	1-FAA-23-1-FAZ-23, 1-FBA-23-1-FBZ-23 (Updated features for new modified motorcycle and tricycle plates series, in white background with purple color strip on bottom)
Region VII	1981–2014	GA-GH, GJ-GN, GP, GR-GU; YA-YF, YT, YU; HN, HP, HR; GI, GO, GQ; YI, YO, YQ; IL; KU; GA-GU; YA-YL, YR-YU; HJ-HL; IR, IS; OS, OT; QO-QS; SA, SB, SV, SW (Inverted motorcycle plates series); SO, SQ, ST; XU (Special motorcycle plate series)
Region VII	2014–2017***	GA, GC-GF (New plate series)
Region VII	2018–2023	GAA-GAZ, GBA-GBZ, GCA-GCZ, GDA-GDZ, GEA-GEZ, GFA-GFZ, GGA-GGZ, GHA-GHZ, GIA-GIZ, GJA-GJZ, GKA-GKZ, GLA-GLZ, GMA-GMZ, GNA-GNZ, GOA-GOZ, GPA-GPZ, GQA-GQZ, GRA-GRZ, GSA-GSZ, GTA-GTZ, GUA-GUZ, GVA-GVZ, GWA-GWZ, GXA-GXZ, GYA-GYZ, GZA-GZZ* (Updated features for inverted motorcycle and tricycle plates series, in white background with orange color strip on bottom)
Region VII	2023–2025*	G-123-AA-AZ, G-123-BA-BZ, G-123-CA-CZ, G-123-DA-DZ, G-123-EA-EZ, G-123-FA-FZ, G-123-GA-GZ, G-123-HA-HZ, G-123-IA-IZ, G-123-JA-JZ; G-123-KA-KZ, G-123-LA-LZ, G-123-MA-MZ, G-123-NA-NZ, G-123-OA-OZ, G-123-PA-PZ, G-123-QA-QZ, G-123-RA-RZ, G-123-SA-SZ, G-123-TA-TW, G-123-UA-UZ (Updated features for new motorcycle and tricycle plates series, in white background with orange color strip on bottom)
Region VII	2025–present*	GA-123-A-Z, GB-123-A-Z, GC-123-A-Z, GD-123-A-Z, GE-123-A-Z, GF-123-A-Z, GG-123-A-Z, GH-123-A-Z, GI-123-A-Z, GJ-123-A-Z, GK-123-A-Z, GL-123-A-Z, GM-123-A-Z, GN-123-A-Z, GI-123-A-Z, GP-123-A-Z, GQ-123-A-Z, GR-123-A-Z, GS-123-A-Z, GT-123-A-W, GU-123-A-Z (Updated features for new motorcycle and tricycle plates series, in white background with orange color strip on bottom)
Region VII	2025-present	1-GAA-23-1-GAZ-23, 1-GCA-23-1-GCZ-23 (Updated features for new motorcycle and tricycle plates series, in white background with orange color strip on bottom); 1-GBA-23-1-GBZ-23; 1-GOA-23-1-GOZ-23 (Updated features for new motorcycle and tricycle plates series, in white background with pink color strip on top)
Region VIII	1981–2014***	HA-HH, HJ, HR-HT; HI, HO, HQ; HA-HI, HR, HS, HU (Inverted motorcycle plates series)
Region VIII	2014–2017***	HA (New plate series)
Region VIII	2018–2023	HAA-HAZ, HBA-HBZ, HCA-HCZ, HDA-HDZ, HEA-HEZ, HFA-HFZ, HGA-HGZ, HHA-HHZ, HIA-HIZ, HJA-HJZ, HKA-HKZ, HLA-HLZ, HMA-HMZ, HNA-HNZ, HOA-HOZ, HPA-HPZ, HQA-HQZ, HRA-HRZ, HSA-HSZ, HTA-HTZ, HUA-HUZ, HVA-HVZ, HWA-HWZ, HXA-HXZ, HYA-HYZ, HZA-HZZ* (Updated features for inverted motorcycle and tricycle plates series, in white background with green color strip on bottom)
Region VIII	2023–present*	H-123-AA-AZ, H-123-BA-BZ, H-123-CA-CZ, H-123-DA-DZ, H-123-EA-EZ, H-123-FA-FZ, H-123-GA-GZ, H-123-HA-HZ, H-123-IA-IZ, H-123-JA-JZ, H-123-KA-KZ, H-123-LA-LZ, H-123-MA-MZ, H-123-NA-NZ, H-123-OA-OZ, H-123-PA-PA, H-123-QA-QZ, H-123-RA-RZ, H-123-SA-SZ, H-123-TA-TW, H-123-UA-UZ (Updated features for new motorcycle and tricycle plates series, in white background with green color strip on bottom)
Region VIII	2025-present	1-HBA-23-1-HBK-23 (Updated features for new modified motorcycle and tricycle plates series, in white background with blue color strip on top)
Region IX	1981–2014***	JA-JH, JJ-JN, JP, JR-JT; JI, JO, JQ; JA-JU (Inverted motorcycle plates series)
Region IX	2014–2017***	JA, JC (New plate series)
Region IX/BARMM	2018–2023	JAA-JAZ, JBA-JBZ, JCA-JCZ, JDA-JDZ, JEA-JEZ, JFA-JFZ, JGA-JGZ, JHA-JHZ, JIA-JIZ, JJA-JJZ, JKA-JKZ, JLA-JLZ, JMA-JMZ, JNA-JNZ, JOA-JOZ, JPA-JPZ, JQA-JQZ, JTA-JTZ, JUA-JUZ, JVA-JVZ, JWA-JWZ, JXA-JXZ, JYA-JYZ, JZA-JZZ (Updated features for inverted motorcycle and tricycle plates series, in white background with red color strip on bottom)
Region IX/BARMM	2023–2025*	J-123-AA-AZ, J-123-BA-BZ, J-123-CA-CZ, J-123-DA-DZ, J-123-EA-EZ, J-123-FA-FZ, J-123-GA-GZ, J-123-HA-HZ, J-123-IA-IZ, J-123-JA-JZ, J-123-KA-LZ, J-123-LA-LZ, J-123-MA-MZ, J-123-NA-NZ, J-123-OA-OZ, J-123-PA-PZ, J-123-QA-QZ, J-123-RA-RZ J-123-SA-SZ, J-123-TA-TW, J-123-UA-UZ (Updated features for new motorcycle and tricycle plates series, in white background with red color strip on bottom)
Region IX/BARMM	2025–present*	JA-123-A-Z, JB-123-A-Z, JC-123-A-Z, JD-123-A-Z, JE-123-A-Z, JF-123-A-Z, JG-123-A-Z, JH-123-A-Z, JI-123-A-Z, JJ-123-A-Z, JK-123-A-Z, JL-123-A-Z, JM-123-A-Z, JN-123-A-Z, JO-123-A-Z, JP-123-A-Z, JQ-123-A-Z, JR-123-A-Z, JS-123-A-Z, JT-123-A-Z, JU-123-A-Z (Updated features for new motorcycle and tricycle plates series, in white background with red color strip on bottom)
Region X	1981–2014***	KA-KH, KJ, KL, KP, KS, KT, KU; KI, KO, KQ; KA-KX; AY; FX (Inverted motorcycle plates series); XP (Special motorcycle plate series)
Region X	2014–2017***	KA, KC (New plate series)
Region X	2018–2023	KAA-KAZ, KBA-KBZ, KCA-KCZ, KDA-KDZ, KEA-KEZ, KFA-KFZ, KGA-KGZ, KHA-KHZ, KIA-KIZ, KJA-KJZ, KKA-KKZ, KLA-KLZ, KMA-KMZ, KNA-KNZ, KOA-KOZ, KPA-KPZ, KQA-KQZ, KRA-KRZ, KSA-KSZ, KTA-KTZ, KUA-KUZ, KVA-KVZ, KWA-KWZ, KXA-KXZ, KYA-KYZ, KZA-KZZ (Updated features for inverted motorcycle and tricycle plates series, in white background with gray color strip on bottom)
Region X	2023–2025*	K-123-AA-AZ, K-123-BA-BZ, K-123-CA-CZ, K-123-DA-DZ, K-123-EA-EZ, K-123-FA-FZ, K-123-GA-GZ, K-123-HA-HZ, K-123-IA-IZ, K-123-JA-JZ, K-123-KA-KZ, K-133-LA-LZ, K-123-MA-MZ, K-123-NA-NZ, K-123-OA-OZ, K-123-PA-PZ, K-123-QA-QZ, K-123-RA-RZ K-123-SA-SZ, K-123-TA-TW, K-123-UA-UZ (Updated features for new motorcycle and tricycle plates series, in white background with gray color strip on bottom)
Region X	2025–present*	KA-123-A-Z, KB-123-A-Z, KC-123-A-Z, KD-123-A-Z, KE-123-A-Z, KF-123-A-Z, KG-123-A-Z, KH-123-A-Z, KI-123-A-Z, KJ-123-A-Z, KK-123-A-Z, KL-123-A-Z, KM-123-A-Z, KN-123-A-Z, KO-123-A-Z (Updated features for new motorcycle and tricycle plates series, in white background with gray color strip on bottom)
Region XI	1981–2014*** (Region XI/XIII)	LA-LH, LJ-LN, LP, LR-LU; LI, LO, LQ, IW, IX; LA-LU; OY, OZ; QT-QV; LV-LZ; FY-FZ (Inverted motorcycle plates series); SU, CT, NU, XV, XW (Special motorcycle plate series)
Region XI	2014–2017*** (Region XI)	LA, LC, LD, LE(New plate series)
Region XI	2018–2023	LAA-LAZ, LBA-LBZ, LCA-LCZ, LDA-LDZ, LEA-LEZ, LFA-LFZ, LGA-LGZ, LHA-LHZ, LIA-LIZ, LJA-LJZ, LKA-LKZ, LMA-LMZ, LNA-LNZ, LOA-LOZ, LPA-LPZ, LQA-LQZ, LRA-LRZ, LSA-LSZ, LTA-LTZ, LUA-LUZ, LVA-LVZ, LWA-LWZ, LXA-LXZ, LYA-LYZ, LZA-LZZ (Updated features for inverted motorcycle and tricycle plates series, in white background with blue color strip on bottom)
Region XI	2023–2025*	L-123-AA-AZ, L-123-BA-BZ, L-123-CA-CZ, L-123-DA-DZ, L-123-EA-EZ, L-123-FA-FZ, L-123-GA-GZ, L-123-HA-HZ, L-123-IA-IZ, L-123-JA-JZ, L-123-KA-KZ, L-123-LA-LZ, L-123-MA-MZ, L-123-NA-NZ, L-123-OA-OZ, L-123-PA-PZ, L-123-QA-QZ, L-123-RA-RZ L-123-SA-SZ, L-123-TA-TW, L-123-UA-UZ (Updated features for new motorcycle and tricycle plates series, in white background with blue color strip on bottom)
Region XI	2025–present*	LA-123-A-Z, LB-123-A-Z, LC-123-A-Z, LD-123-A-Z, LE-123-A-Z, LF-123-A-Z, LG-123-A-Z, LH-123-A-Z, LI-123-A-Z, LJ-123-A-Z, LK-123-A-Z, LL-123-A-Z, LM-123-A-Z, LN-123-A-Z, LO-123-A-Z, LP-123-A-Z, LQ-123-A-Z, LR-123-A-Z, LS-123-A-Z (Updated features for new motorcycle and tricycle plates series, in white background with blue color strip on bottom)
Region XII	1981–2014***	MA-MH, MJ-MN, MP, MR-MT; MI, MO, MQ; MA-MU; OK-OL; MX-MZ; (Inverted motorcycle plates series); SX-SZ, XY, XZ (Special motorcycle plate series)
Region XII	2014–2017***	MA, MC (New plate series)
Region XII	2018–2023	MAA-MAZ, MBA-MBZ, MCA-MCZ, MDA-MDZ, MEA-MEZ, MFA-MFZ, MGA-MGZ, MHA-MHZ, MIA-MIZ, MJA-MJZ, MKA-MKZ, MLA-MLZ, MMA-MMZ, MNA-MNZ, MOA-MOZ, MPA-MPZ, MQA-MQZ, MRA-MRZ, MSA-MSZ, MTA-MTZ, MUA-MUZ, MVA-MVZ, MWA-MWZ, MXA-MXZ, MYA-MYZ, MZA-MZZ (Updated features for inverted motorcycle and tricycle plates series, in white background with brown color strip on bottom)
Region XII	2023–2025*	M-123-AA-AZ, M-123-BA-BZ, M-123-CA-CZ, M-123-DA-DZ, M-123-EA-EZ, M-123-FA-FZ, M-123-GA-GZ, M-123-HA-HZ, M-123-IA-IZ, M-123-JA-JZ, M-123-KA-KZ, M-123-LA-LZ, M-123-MA-MZ, M-133-NA-NZ, M-123-OA-OZ, M-123-PA-PZ, M-123-QA-QZ, M-123-RA-RZ, M-123-SA-SZ, M-123-TA-TW, M-123-UA-UZ (Updated features for new motorcycle and tricycle plates series, in white background with brown color strip on bottom)
Region XII	2025–present*	MA-123-A-Z, MB-123-A-Z, MC-123-A-Z, MD-123-A-Z, ME-123-A-Z, MF-123-A-Z, MG-123-A-Z, MH-123-A-Z, MI-123-A-Z (Updated features for new motorcycle and tricycle plates series, in white background with brown color strip on bottom)
Region XIII	2014–2017	MS-MT (New plate series)
Region XIII	2018–present*	ZAA-ZAZ, ZBA-ZBZ, ZCA-ZCZ, ZDA-ZDZ, ZEA-ZEZ, ZFA-ZFZ, ZGA-ZGZ, ZHA-ZHZ, ZIA-ZIZ, ZJA-ZJZ, ZKA-ZKZ, ZLA-ZLZ, ZMA-ZMZ, ZNA-ZNZ, ZOA-ZOZ, ZTA-ZTZ, ZUA-ZUZ, ZVA-ZVZ, ZWA-ZWZ, ZXA-ZXZ, ZYA-ZYZ, ZZA-ZZZ (Updated features for inverted motorcycle and tricycle plates series, in white background with pink color strip on bottom)
Region XIII	2025–present*	Z-123-AA-AZ, Z-123-BA-BZ, Z-123-CA-CZ, Z-123-DA-DZ, Z-123-EA-EZ, Z-123-FA-FZ, Z-123-GA-GZ, Z-123-HA-HZ (Updated features for new motorcycle and tricycle plates series, in pink color strip on bottom)

* Format DDD-LLL (e.g. 123-NAA & 456-NOA)
** Format L-DDD-LL (e.g. N-123-AA & N-456-OA)
*** Format L-DDD-LL (e.g. NA-123-A & NO-456-A)
**** Format D-LLL-DD (e.g. 1-NAA-23 & 4-NOA-56)

- Private Motor Tricycle (TC):

Region	Year	Series issued
Region I/C.A.R.	2014–2015	AO, AZ (New plate series)
Region I	2016–present	A-1234-A-A-1234-Z; I-1234-A-I-1234-N (Updated features for new modified tricycle plates series, in white background with green color strip on top)
C.A.R.	2016–present	Y-1234-A-Y-1234-F (Updated features for new modified tricycle plates series, in white background with pink color strip on top)
Region II	2014-2015	BO, BP (New plate series)
Region II	2016–present	B-1234-A-B-1234-Z (Updated features for new modified tricycle plates series, in white background with red color strip on top)
Region II	2016–present	B-0-A-123-B-0-Z-123, B-1-A-123-B-1-Z-123, B-2-A-123-B-2-Z-123, B-3-A-123-B-3-Z-123, B-4-A-123-B-4-Z-123, B-5-A-123-B-5-Z-123 (Updated features for new modified tricycle plates series, in white background with red color strip on top)
Region III	2014-2015	CO, CP (New plate series)
Region III	2016–present	C-1234-A-C-1334-M; C-1244-X-C-1234-Z; R-1234-A-R-1234-N; W-2345-S-W-1234-Z (Updated features for new modified tricycle plates series, in white background with blue color strip on top); C-1234-N-C-1234-W; R-1234-O-R-1234-Z (Updated features for new modified tricycle plates series, in white background with gray color strip on bottom); W-1234-A-W-1234-N (Updated features for new modified tricycle plates series, in white background with gray color strip on bottom); W-1234-N-W-1234-S (Updated features for new modified tricycle plates series, in white background with orange color strip on top)
Region III	2016–present	C-0-A-123-C-0-Z-123, C-1-A-123-C-1-Z-123, C-2-A-123-C-2-Z-123, C-3-A-123-C-3-Z-123, C-4-A-123-C-4-Z-123, C-5-A-123-C-5-Z-123, C-6-A-123-C-6-Z-123, C-7-A-123-C-7-Z-123 (Updated features for new modified tricycle plates series, in white background with blue color strip on top)
Region IV-A/IV-B	2014-2016	DO, DP, DZ (New plate series)
Region IV-A	2016–present	D-1234-A-D-1234-M, D-1234-S-D-1234-Z; O-1234-A-O-1234-R (Updated features for new modified tricycle plates series, in white background with purple color strip on top); D-1234-N-D-1234-R; O-1234-S-O-1234-Z (Updated features for new modified tricycle plates series, in white background with red color strip on bottom)
Region IV-A	2016–present	D-0-A-123-D-0-Z-123; O-5-A-123-O-5-Z-123; O-6-A-123-O-6-Z-123, O-7-A-123-O-7-Z-123; O-8-A-123-O-8-Z-123; O-9-A-123-O-9-Z-123 (Updated features for new modified tricycle plates series, in white background with purple color strip on top); D-1-A-123-D-1-Z-123, D-2-A-123-D-2-Z-123, D-3-A-123-D-3-Z-123, D-4-A-123-D-4-Z-123, D-5-A-123-D-5-P-123 (Updated features for new modified tricycle plates series, in white background with red color strip on bottom) D-5-Q-123-D-5-Z-123, D-6-A-123-D-6-Z-123, D-7-A-123-D-7-Z-123, D-8-A-123-D-8-Z-123, D-9-A-123-D-9-Z-123; O-0-A-123-O-0-Z-123, O-1-A-123-O-1-Z-123, O-2-A-123-O-2-Z-123, O-3-A-123-O-3-Z-123, O-4-A-123-O-4-Z-123 (Updated features for new modified tricycle plates series, in white background with green color strip on bottom)
Region IV-B	2016–present	V-1234-A-V-1234-M (Updated features for new modified tricycle plates series, in white background with orange color strip on top)
Region V	2014-2015	EO (New plate series)
Region V	2016–present	E-1234-A-E-1234-M, E-1234-V-E-1234-Z (Updated features for new modified tricycle plates series, in white background with gray color strip on top); E-1234-N-E-1234-Y (Updated features for new modified tricycle plates series, in white background with orange color strip on top)
Region V	2016–present	E-0-A-123-E-0-Z-123, E-1-A-123-E-1-Z-123, E-2-A-123-E-2-Z-123, E-3-A-123-E-3-Z-123, E-4-A-123-E-4-Z-123, E-5-A-123-E-5-Z-123 (Updated features for new modified tricycle plates series, in white background with gray color strip on top)
Region VI	2014-2015	FO (New plate series)
Region VI	2016–present	F-1234-A-F-1234-C (Updated features for new modified tricycle plates series, in white background with purple color strip on bottom); F-1234-D-F-1234-E (Updated features for new modified tricycle plates series, in white background with red color strip on bottom); F-1234-F-F-1234-Z (Updated features for new modified tricycle plates series, in white background with green color strip on bottom)
Region VI	2016–present	F-0-A-123-F-0-Z-123, F-1-A-123-F-1-Z-123, F-2-A-123-F-2-Z-123, F-3-A-123-F-3-Z-123, F-4-A-123-F-4-Z-123, F-5-A-123-F-5-Z-123, F-6-A-123-F-6-Z-123, F-7-A-123-F-7-Z-123, F-8-A-123-F-8-Z-123, F-9-A-123-F-9-Z-123 (Updated features for new modified tricycle plates series, in white background with purple color strip on bottom)
Region VII	2014-2015	GO (New plate series)
Region VII	2016–present	G-1234-A-G-1234-Z (Updated features for new modified tricycle plates series, in white background with orange color strip on bottom)
Region VII	2016–present	G-0-A-123-G-0-Z-123, G-1-A-123-G-1-Z-123, G-2-A-123-G-2-Z-123, G-3-A-123-G-3-Z-123 (Updated features for new modified tricycle plates series, in white background with orange color strip on bottom); G-4-A-123-G-4-Z-123, G-5-A-123-G-5-Z-123, G-6-A-123-G-6-Z-123, G-7-A-123-G-7-Z-123, G-8-A-123-G-8-Z-123, G-9-A-123-G-9-Z-123 (Updated features for new modified tricycle plates series, in white background with pink color strip on top)
Region VIII	2014-2015	HO (New plate series)
Region VIII	2016–present	H-1234-A-H-1234-Z (Updated features for new modified tricycle plates series, in white background with green color strip on bottom)
Region VIII	2016–present	H-0-A-123-H-0-Z-123, H-1-A-123-H-1-Z-123, H-2-A-123-H-2-Z-123, H-3-A-123-H-3-Z-123 (Updated features for new modified tricycle plates series, in white background with green color strip on bottom)
Region IX/BARMM	2014-2015	JO (New plate series)
Region IX/BARMM	2016–present	J-1234-A-J-1234-W (Updated features for new modified tricycle plates series, in white background with red color strip on top)
Region X	2014-2015	KO, KP (New plate series)
Region X	2016–present	K-1234-A-K-1234-Z (Updated features for new modified tricycle plates series, in white background with gray color strip on bottom)
Region X	2016–present	K-0-A-123-K-0-Z-123, K-1-A-123-K-1-Z-123, K-2-A-123-K-2-Z-123, K-3-A-123-K-3-Z-123 (Updated features for new modified tricycle plates series, in white background with gray color strip on bottom)
Region XI	2014-2015	LO (New plate series)
Region XI	2016–present	L-1234-A-L-1234-Z (Updated features for new modified tricycle plates series, in white background with blue color strip on bottom)
Region XI	2016–present	L-0-A-123-L-0-Z-123, L-1-A-123-L-1-Z-123, L-2-A-123-L-2-Z-123, L-3-A-123-L-3-Z-123, L-4-A-123-L-4-Z-123, L-5-A-123-L-5-Z-123, L-6-A-123-L-6-Z-123, L-7-A-123-L-7-Z-123, L-8-A-123-L-8-Z-123, L-9-A-123-L-9-Z-123 (Updated features for new modified tricycle plates series, in white background with blue color strip on bottom)
Region XII	2014-2015	MO (New plate series)
Region XII	2016–present	M-1234-A-M-1234-Z (Updated features for new modified tricycle plates series, in white background with brown color strip on bottom)
Region XII	2016–present	M-0-A-123-M-0-Z-123, M-1-A-123-M-1-Z-123 (Updated features for new modified tricycle plates series, in white background with brown color strip on bottom)
Region XIII	2014-2015	MP (New plate series)
Region XIII	2016–present	Z-1234-A-Z-1234-S (Updated features for new modified tricycle plates series, in white background with pink color strip on bottom)

* Format L-DDDD-L (e.g. N-1234-A & N-4567-O)
** Format L-D-L-DDD (e.g. N-1-A-234 & N-5-O-678)

  - Public Motor Tricycle (TC):

Region	Year	Series issued
Region I/C.A.R.	1981–2013	AV-AZ, AS, AT; ZV, ZZ; XC, XL; QC, QG, QI, QS, QU; AV-AZ (Inverted tricycle plates series); JZ; AA(0), AE(0)-AF(0), AR(0)-AT(0); BA(0), BH(0)(Special tricycle plate series)
Region I/C.A.R.	2014–2015	AB (New plate series)
Region I	2016–present	AA-AZ; IA-IE (Updated features for tricycle plates series in yellow background with green color strip on top)
Region I	2025–present	1-AA-234-1-AM-234 (Updated features for modified tricycle plates series in yellow background with green color strip on top)
C.A.R.	2016–present	YA-YH (Updated features for tricycle plates series in yellow background with pink color strip on top)
C.A.R.	2025-present	1-YA-234-1-YF-234 (Updated features for modified tricycle plates series in yellow background with pink color strip on top)
Region II	1981–2013	BV-BZ, BN, BP, BR-BU; KZ; XB, XJ; QF, QY; BV-BX (Inverted motorcycle plates series); AB(0), AC(0), BB(0)-BG(0) (Special tricycle plate series)
Region II	2014–2015	BB (New plate series)
Region II	2016–present	BA-BN (Updated features for tricycle plates series in yellow background with red color strip on top)
Region II	2025-present	1-BA-234-1-BE-234 (Updated features for modified tricycle plates series in yellow background with red color strip on top)
Region III	1981–2013	CV-CZ; RV-RZ; CU; RJ-RN, RR-RU; XD, XE, XM, XN, XP; ES; QA, QB, QD, QE, QK, QL, QN, QR-QT, QV; CV-CZ; RV-RX; (Inverted tricycle plates series); HZ; AD(0), AK(0), AN(0), BI(0) (Special tricycle plate series)
Region III	2014–2015	CB (New plate series)
Region III	2016–present	CA-CZ; RA-RZ; WA-WN (Updated features for tricycle plates series in yellow background with blue color strip on top)
Region III	2025-present	1-CA-234-1-CP-234 (Updated features for modified tricycle plates series in yellow background with blue color strip on top)
Region IV-A/Region IV-B	1981–2013	DV-DZ, VV-VZ; DT, DU; VK-VN, VP, VR-VV; WV-WY; WP, WR-WU; XA, XF, XG; QH, QO; DV-DZ; VV, VW (Inverted tricycle plates series); JY; AG(0)-AJ(0), AO(0)-AQ(0), AY(0)-AZ(0); BJ(0)-BP(0) (Special tricycle plate series)
Region IV-A/Region IV-B	2014–2015	DB, DV (New plate series)
Region IV-A	2016–present	DA-DZ; OA-OZ (Updated features for tricycle plates series in yellow background with purple color strip on top)
Region IV-A	2025-present	1-DA-234-1-DM-234 (Updated features for modified tricycle plates series in yellow background with purple color strip on top)
Region IV-B	2016–present	VA-VU (Updated features for tricycle plates series in yellow background with orange color strip on top)
Region IV-B	2025-present	1-VA-234-1-VC-234 (Updated features for modified tricycle plates series in yellow background with orange color strip on top)
Region V	1981–2013	EV-DZ, ET-EU; QJ, QQ; EV-EZ (Inverted tricycle plates series), JZ; AU(0)-AX(0); BQ(0)-BS(0) (Special tricycle plate series)
Region V	2014–2015	EB (New plate series)
Region V	2016–present	EA-EL (Updated features for tricycle plates series in yellow background with gray color strip on top)
Region V	2025-present	1-EA-234-1-EC-234 (Updated features for modified tricycle plates series in yellow background with gray color strip on top)
Region VI	1981–2013	FV-FZ, FR-FU; FV-FX (Inverted tricycle plates series); BT(0), BU(0); JA(0)-JD(0); ZA(0) (Special tricycle plate series)
Region VI	2014–2015	FB (New plate series)
Region VI	2016–present	FA-FN (Updated features for tricycle plates series in yellow background with purple color strip on bottom)
Region VI	2025-present	1-FA-234-1-FC-234 (Updated features for modified tricycle plates series in yellow background with purple color strip on bottom)
Region VII	1981–2013	GV-GZ; XP, XR; QX, QZ; GV-GX (Inverted tricycle plates series); BV(0)-BZ(0) (Special tricycle plate series)
Region VII	2014–2015	GB (New plate series)
Region VII	2016–present	GA-GT (Updated features for tricycle plates series in yellow background with orange color strip on bottom)
Region VII	2025-present	1-GA-234-1-GF-234 (Updated features for modified tricycle plates series in yellow background with orange color strip on bottom)
Region VIII	1981–2013	HV-HY; CA(0)-CD(0) (Special tricycle plate series)
Region VIII	2014–2015	HB (New plate series)
Region VIII	2016–present	HA-HL (Updated features for tricycle plates series in yellow background with green color strip on bottom)
Region VIII	2025-present	1-HA-234-1-HE-234 (Updated features for modified tricycle plates series in yellow background with green color strip on bottom)
Region IX/BARMM	1981–2013	JV-JX; ZB(0)-ZF(0), JE(0)-JN(0) (Special tricycle plate series)
Region IX/BARMM	2014–2015	JB (New plate series)
Region IX/BARMM	2016–present	JA-JX (Updated features for tricycle plates series in yellow background with red color strip on bottom)
Region IX/BARMM	2025-present	1-JA-234-1-JF-234 (Updated features for modified tricycle plates series in yellow background with red color strip on bottom)
Region X	1981–2013	KV-KY; KV, KW (Inverted tricycle plates series); CE(0)-CG(0) (Special tricycle plate series)
Region X	2014–2015	KB (New plate series)
Region X	2016–present	KA-KN (Updated features for tricycle plates series in yellow background with gray color strip on bottom)
Region X	2025-present	1-KA-234-1-KF-234 (Updated features for modified tricycle plates series in yellow background with gray color strip on bottom)
Region XI/Region XIII	1981–2013	LV-LZ, QM, QP; LV (Inverted tricycle plates series); CH(0)-CK(0) (Special tricycle plate series)
Region XI	2014–2015	LB, LV (New plate series)
Region XI	2016–present	LA-LP (Updated features for inverted tricycle plates series in yellow background with blue color strip on bottom)
Region XI	2025-present	1-LA-234-1-LF-234 (Updated features for modified tricycle plates series in yellow background with blue color strip on bottom)
Region XII	1981–2013	MV-MZ; MV, MW (Inverted tricycle plates series); CL(0), CM(0) (Special tricycle plate series)
Region XII	2014–2015	MB (New plate series)
Region XII	2016–present	MA-MP (Updated features for tricycle plates series in yellow background with brown color strip on bottom)
Region XII	2025-present	1-MA-234-1-MF-234 (Updated features for modified tricycle plates series in yellow background with brown color strip on bottom)
Region XIII	2014–2015	MV (New plate series)
Region XIII	2018/6–present	ZA-ZI (Updated features forn tricycle plates series in yellow background with pink color strip on bottom)
Region XIII	2025-present	1-ZA-234-1-ZE-234 (Updated features for modified tricycle plates series in yellow background with pink color strip on bottom)

* Format LL-DDDD (e.g. NA-1234 & NO-5678)
** Format D-LL-DDD (e.g. 1-NA-234 & 5-NO-678)

Note: For 2016 to 2025, Updated Motorcycle Plate Numbers, Motorcycle and Tricycle Plates have the same 3 digit number and 3 digit letter format. For 2023 to present, Motorcycle and Tricycle Plates have modified at the following formats: the 1 digit letter, 3 digit number and 2 last digit letter format; the 2 digit letter, 3 digit number and 1 last digit letter format; the 1 digit number, 3 digit letter and 2 last digit number format. For 2024 to present, Updated Private Tricycle Plate Numbers have modified at the following formats: the 1 first digit letter, 4 digit number and last 1 digit letter combination; the first 1 digit letter, the second 1 digit number, the third 1 digit letter and last 3 digit letter combination. While the Updated Public Tricycle Plate numbers have 2 first digit letter and 4 last digit numbers, similar to the Conduction Stickers Issued from 2003 to 2017. For 2025 to present, modified format version for public tricycles have first 1 digit number, 2 digit letters and last 3 digit number.

* Uses MV file numbers or Temporary Plates since White plates are in production. ** Uses MV file numbers or Temporary Plates since Yellow plates are in production. *** All motorcycle ang tricycle plates were registered from 2014 to 2017 must replaced from 7-digit character to the new 6-digit motorcycle license plates with a different specifications. The old green and yellow plates series for older motorcycles and tricycles registered from 2013 and below must be replaced with a newly updated 6-digit license plates series.

== Government-owned issued motorcycle plates ==
Government (motorcycle plate series with approximate year issued):

Year	Series issued
1981–1989	SA-SB
1990–1999	SC-SG
2000–2009	SH, SJ-SK
2010–2013	SL-SM
2014–2016	SA (New plate series)

Government (new motorcycle and plate series with approximate region and year issued):

Metro Manila

Year	Series issued
2024–present*	SNA-SNZ; SPA-SPZ; SQA-SQZ; STA-STZ, SUA-SUZ** (Updated features for inverted government motorcycle and tricycle plates series, in white background)

Provincial

Region	Year	Series issued
Region I	2024–present*	SAA-SAI** (Updated feature for inverted government motorcycle and tricycle plates series, in white background with green color strip on top)
C.A.R.	2024–present*	SYA-SYJ** (Updated feature for inverted government motorcycle and tricycle plates series, in white background with pink color strip on top)
Region II	2024–present*	SBA-SBK** (Updated features for newinverted government motorcycle and tricycle plates plates series, in white background with red color strip on top)
Region III	2024–present*	SCA-SCS** (Updated features for inverted government motorcycle and tricycle plates series, in white background with blue color strip on top)
Region IV-A	2024–present*	SDA-SDV** (Updated features for inverted government motorcycle and tricycle plates series, in white background with purple color strip on top)
Region IV-B	2024–present*	SVA-SVJ** (Updated features for inverted government motorcycle and tricycle plates series, in white background with orange color strip on top)
Region V	2024–present*	SEA-SEM** (Updated features for inverted government motorcycle and tricycle plates series, in white background with gray color strip on top)
Region VI	2024–present*	SFA-SFK** (Updated features for inverted government motorcycle and tricycle plates series, in white background with purple color strip on bottom)
Region VII	2024–present*	SGA-SGN** (Updated features for inverted government motorcycle and tricycle plates series, in white background with orange color strip on bottom)
Region VIII	2024–present*	SHA-SHL** (Updated features for inverted government motorcycle and tricycle plates series, in white background with green color strip on bottom)
Region IX/BARMM	2024–present*	SJA-SJR** (Updated features for inverted government motorcycle and tricycle plates series, in white background with red color strip on bottom)
Region X	2024–present*	SKA-SKI** (Updated features for inverted government motorcycle and tricycle plates series, in white background with gray color strip on bottom)
Region XI	2024–present*	SLA-SLJ** (Updated features for inverted government motorcycle and tricycle plates series, in white background with blue color strip on bottom)
Region XII	2024–present*	SMA-SMK** (Updated features for inverted government motorcycle and tricycle plates series, in white background with brown color strip on bottom)
Region XIII	2024–present*	SZA-SZG** (Updated features for inverted government motorcycle and tricycle plates series, in white background with pink color strip on bottom)

* Format DDD-LLL (e.g. 123-SAA)

*Vehicles registered from 2016 onwards are currently uses MV file numbers or Temporary Plates since government white plates with FE-Schrift in red colored font type are still in production. ** Format DDD-LLL (e.g. 123-SAA)

== Other special issued motorcycle plates ==
=== Electric ===
Metro Manila

Year	Series issued
2025–present*	N-123-VA-N-123-VM, N-123-WA-N-123-WM, N-123-XA-N-123-XM*** (Updated features for electric motorcycle and tricycle plates series, in white background)

Provincial

Region	Year	Series issued
Region I	2025–present*	A-123-VA-A-123-VM*** (Updated feature for electric motorcycle and tricycle plates series, in white background with green color strip on top)
C.A.R.	2025–present*	Y-123-VA-Y-123-VM*** (Updated feature for electric motorcycle and tricycle plates series, in white background with pink color strip on top)
Region II	2025–present*	B-123-VA-B-123-VM*** (Updated features for electric motorcycle and tricycle plates plates series, in white background with red color strip on top)
Region III	2025–present*	C-123-VA-C-123-VM, C-123-WA-C-123-WG*** (Updated features for electric motorcycle and tricycle plates series, in white background with blue color strip on top)
Region IV-A	2025–present*	D-123-VA-D-123-VM, D-123-WA-D-123-WK*** (Updated features for electric motorcycle and tricycle plates series, in white background with purple color strip on top)
Region IV-B	2025–present*	V-123-VA-V-123-VM*** (Updated features for electric motorcycle and tricycle plates series, in white background with orange color strip on top)
Region V	2025–present*	E-123-VA-E-123-VM*** (Updated features for electric motorcycle and tricycle plates series, in white background with gray color strip on top)
Region VI	2025–present*	F-123-VA-F-123-VM*** (Updated features for electric motorcycle and tricycle plates series, in white background with purple color strip on bottom)
Region VII	2025–present*	G-123-VA-G-123-VM, G-123-2A-G-123-WI*** (Updated features for electric motorcycle and tricycle plates series, in white background with orange color strip on bottom)
Region VIII	2025–present*	H-123-VA-H-123-VM*** (Updated features for electric motorcycle and tricycle plates series, in white background with green color strip on bottom)
Region IX/BARMM	2025–present*	J-123-VA-J-123-VM*** (Updated features for electric motorcycle and tricycle plates series, in white background with red color strip on bottom)
Region X	2025–present*	K-123-VA-K-123-VM*** (Updated features for electric motorcycle and tricycle plates series, in white background with gray color strip on bottom)
Region XI	2025–present*	L-123-VA-L-123-VM, L-123-WA-L-123-WE*** (Updated features for electric motorcycle and tricycle plates series, in white background with blue color strip on bottom)
Region XII	2025–present*	M-123-VA-M-123-VM*** (Updated features for electric motorcycle and tricycle plates series, in white background with brown color strip on bottom)
Region XIII	2025–present*	Z-123-VA-Z-123-VM*** (Updated features for electric motorcycle and tricycle plates series, in white background with pink color strip on bottom)

*** Format L-DDD-LL (e.g. N-123-VA)

=== Hybrid ===
Metro Manila

Year	Series issued
2023–present*	N-123-VN-N-123-VZ, N-123-WN-N-123-WZ (Updated features for hybrid motorcycle and tricycle plates series, in white background)

Provincial

Region	Year	Series issued
Region I	2025–present*	A-123-VN-A-123-VZ*** (Updated feature for hybrid motorcycle and tricycle plates series, in white background with green color strip on top)
C.A.R.	2025–present*	Y-123-VN-Y-123-VZ*** (Updated feature for hybrid motorcycle and tricycle plates series, in white background with pink color strip on top)
Region II	2025–present*	B-123-VN-B-123-VZ*** (Updated features for hybrid motorcycle and tricycle plates plates series, in white background with red color strip on top)
Region III	2025–present*	C-123-VN-C-123-VZ*** (Updated features for hybrid motorcycle and tricycle plates series, in white background with blue color strip on top)
Region IV-A	2025–present*	D-123-VN-D-123-VZ*** (Updated features for hybrid motorcycle and tricycle plates series, in white background with purple color strip on top)
Region IV-B	2025–present*	V-123-VN-V-123-VZ*** (Updated features for hybrid motorcycle and tricycle plates series, in white background with orange color strip on top)
Region V	2025–present*	E-123-VN-E-123-VZ*** (Updated features for hybrid motorcycle and tricycle plates series, in white background with gray color strip on top)
Region VI	2025–present*	F-123-VN-F-123-VZ*** (Updated features for hybrid motorcycle and tricycle plates series, in white background with purple color strip on bottom)
Region VII	2025–present*	G-123-VN-G-123-VZ*** (Updated features for hybrid motorcycle and tricycle plates series, in white background with orange color strip on bottom)
Region VIII	2025–present*	H-123-VN-H-123-VZ*** (Updated features for hybrid motorcycle and tricycle plates series, in white background with green color strip on bottom)
Region IX/BARMM	2025–present*	J-123-VN-J-123-VZ*** (Updated features for hybrid motorcycle and tricycle plates series, in white background with red color strip on bottom)
Region X	2025–present*	K-123-VN-K-123-VZ*** (Updated features for hybrid motorcycle and tricycle plates series, in white background with gray color strip on bottom)
Region XI	2025–present*	L-123-VN-L-123-VZ*** (Updated features for hybrid motorcycle and tricycle plates series, in white background with blue color strip on bottom)
Region XII	2025–present*	M-123-VN-M-123-VZ*** (Updated features for hybrid motorcycle and tricycle plates series, in white background with brown color strip on bottom)
Region XIII	2025–present*	Z-123-VN-Z-123-VZ*** (Updated features for hybrid motorcycle and tricycle plates series, in white background with pink color strip on bottom)

*** Format L-DDD-LL (e.g. N-123-VN)

=== Vintage ===
Metro Manila

Year	Series issued
2025–present*	N-123-TX-N-123-TZ, P-123-TX-P-123-TZ*** (Updated features for vintage motorcycle and tricycle plates series, in white background)

Provincial

Region	Year	Series issued
Region I	2025–present*	A-123-TX-A-123-TZ*** (Updated feature for vintage motorcycle and tricycle plates series, in white background with green color strip on top)
C.A.R.	2025–present*	Y-123-TX*** (Updated feature for vintage motorcycle and tricycle plates series, in white background with pink color strip on top)
Region II	2025–present*	B-123-TX-B-123-TZ*** (Updated features for vintage motorcycle and tricycle plates plates series, in white background with red color strip on top)
Region III	2025–present*	C-123-TX-C-123-TZ; R-123-TX*** (Updated features for vintage motorcycle and tricycle plates series, in white background with blue color strip on top)
Region IV-A	2025–present*	D-123-TX-D-123-TZ; O-123-TX-O-123-TZ*** (Updated features for vintage and tricycle plates series, in white background with purple color strip on top)
Region IV-B	2025–present*	V-123-TX-V-123-TY*** (Updated features for vintage motorcycle and tricycle plates series, in white background with orange color strip on top)
Region V	2025–present*	E-123-TX-E-123-TZ*** (Updated features for vintage motorcycle and tricycle plates series, in white background with gray color strip on top)
Region VI	2025–present*	F-123-TX-F-123-TZ; FT-123-X*** (Updated features for vintage motorcycle and tricycle plates series, in white background with purple color strip on bottom)
Region VII	2025–present*	G-123-TX-G-123-TZ; GT-123-X-GT-123-Z*** (Updated features for vintage motorcycle and tricycle plates series, in white background with orange color strip on bottom)
Region VIII	2025–present*	H-123-TX-H-123-TZ*** (Updated features for vintage motorcycle and tricycle plates series, in white background with green color strip on bottom)
Region IX/BARMM	2025–present*	J-123-TX-J-123-TZ*** (Updated features for vintage motorcycle and tricycle plates series, in white background with red color strip on bottom)
Region X	2025–present*	K-123-TX-K-123-TZ*** (Updated features for vintage motorcycle and tricycle plates series, in white background with gray color strip on bottom)
Region XI	2025–present*	L-123-TX-L-123-TZ*** (Updated features for vintage motorcycle and tricycle plates series, in white background with blue color strip on bottom)
Region XII	2025–present*	M-123-TX-M-123-TZ*** (Updated features for vintage motorcycle and tricycle plates series, in white background with brown color strip on bottom)
Region XIII	2025–present*	Z-123-TX-Z-123-TZ*** (Updated features for vintage motorcycle and tricycle plates series, in white background with pink color strip on bottom)

*** Format L-DDD-LL (e.g. N-123-VA)

== Gallery ==
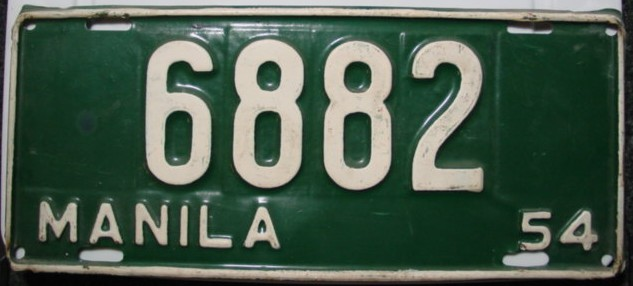
Manila license plate from 1954 (6882)

1961 license plate from Manila celebrating Rizal's 100th birthday (L*19551)

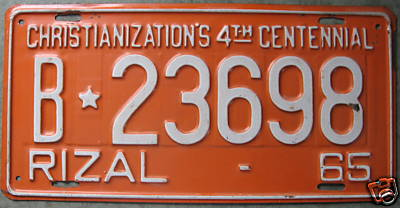
License plate from Rizal, issued in 1965. The letter "B" stands for a lightweight vehicle. (B*23698)

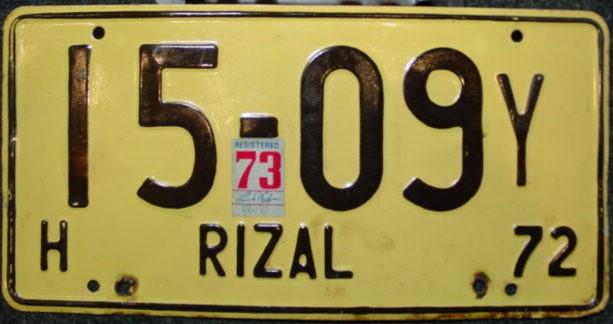
1972 license plate from Rizal (15-09Y)

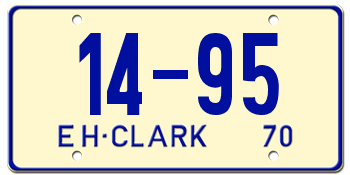
US Forces Clark license plate

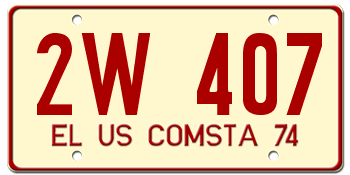
US Forces Communication Station license plate

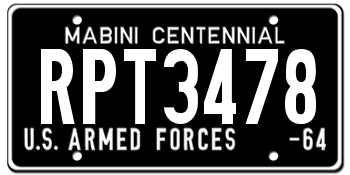
US Forces Mabini 1964 license plate

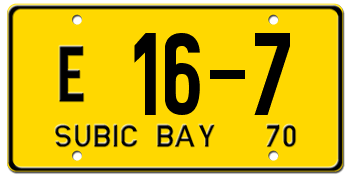
US Forces Subic license plate

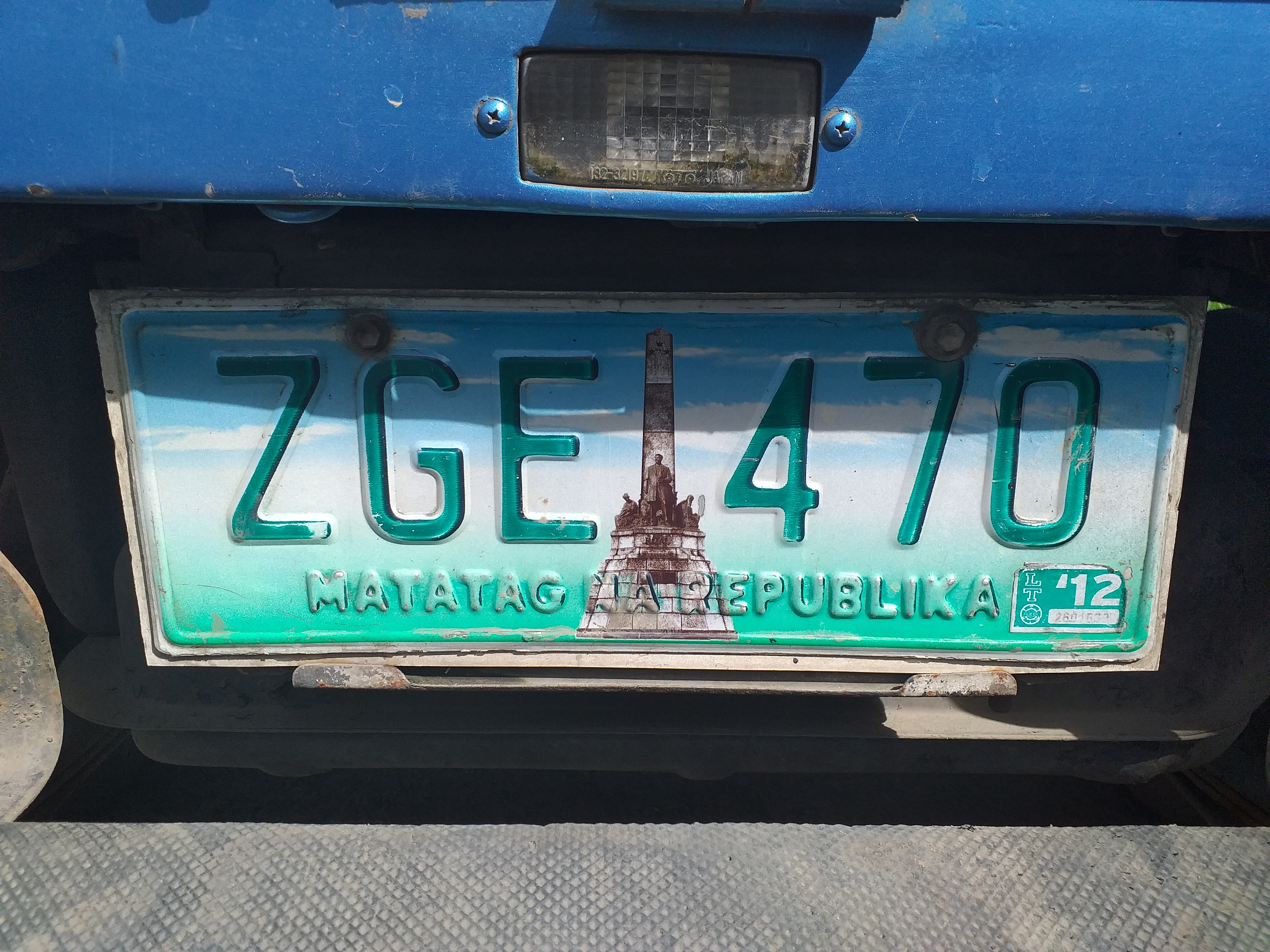
Private vehicle license plate produced in 2009. Note the Jose Rizal Monument which replaced the white paint.

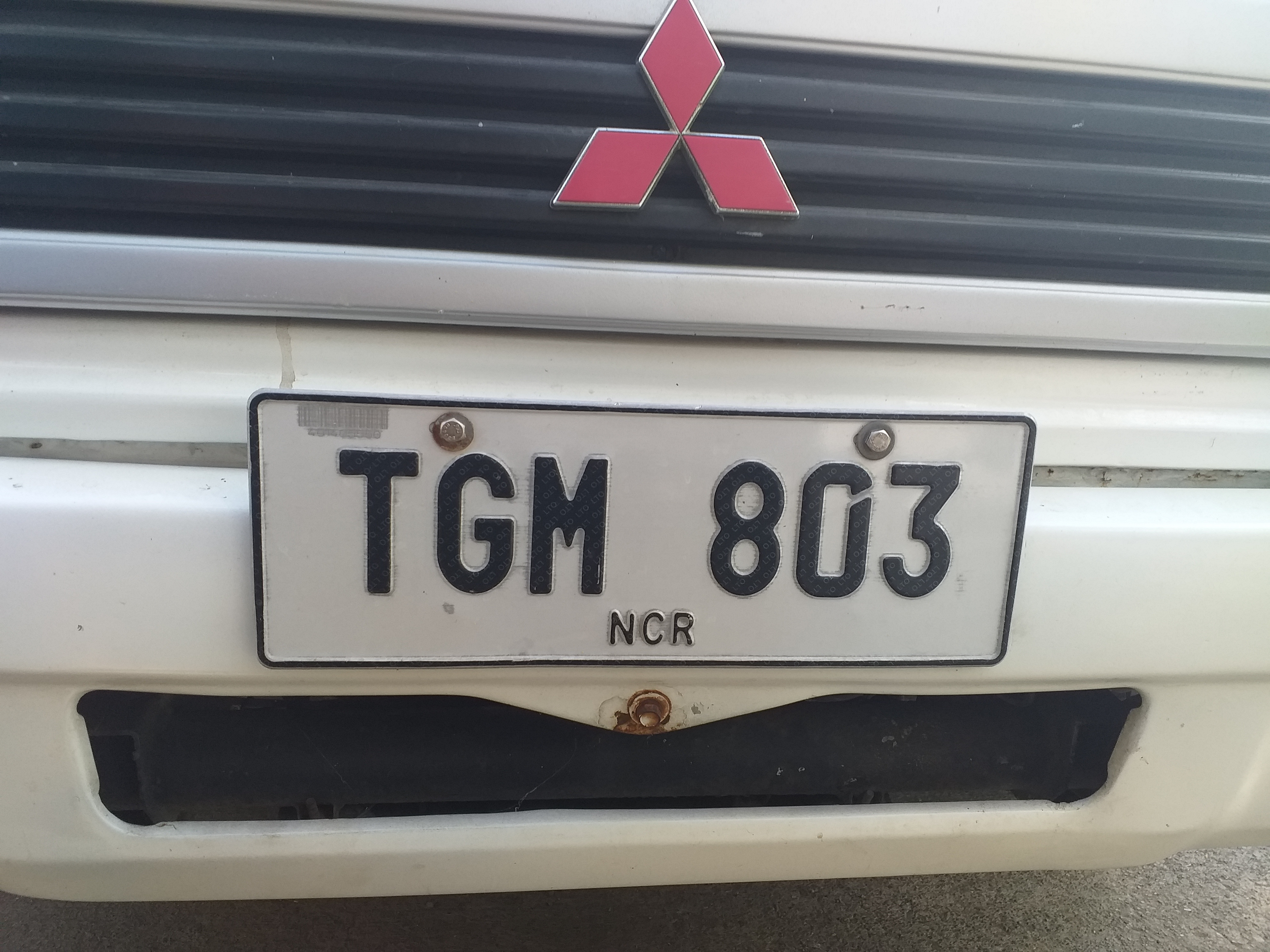
Private vehicle license plate produced in 2015.

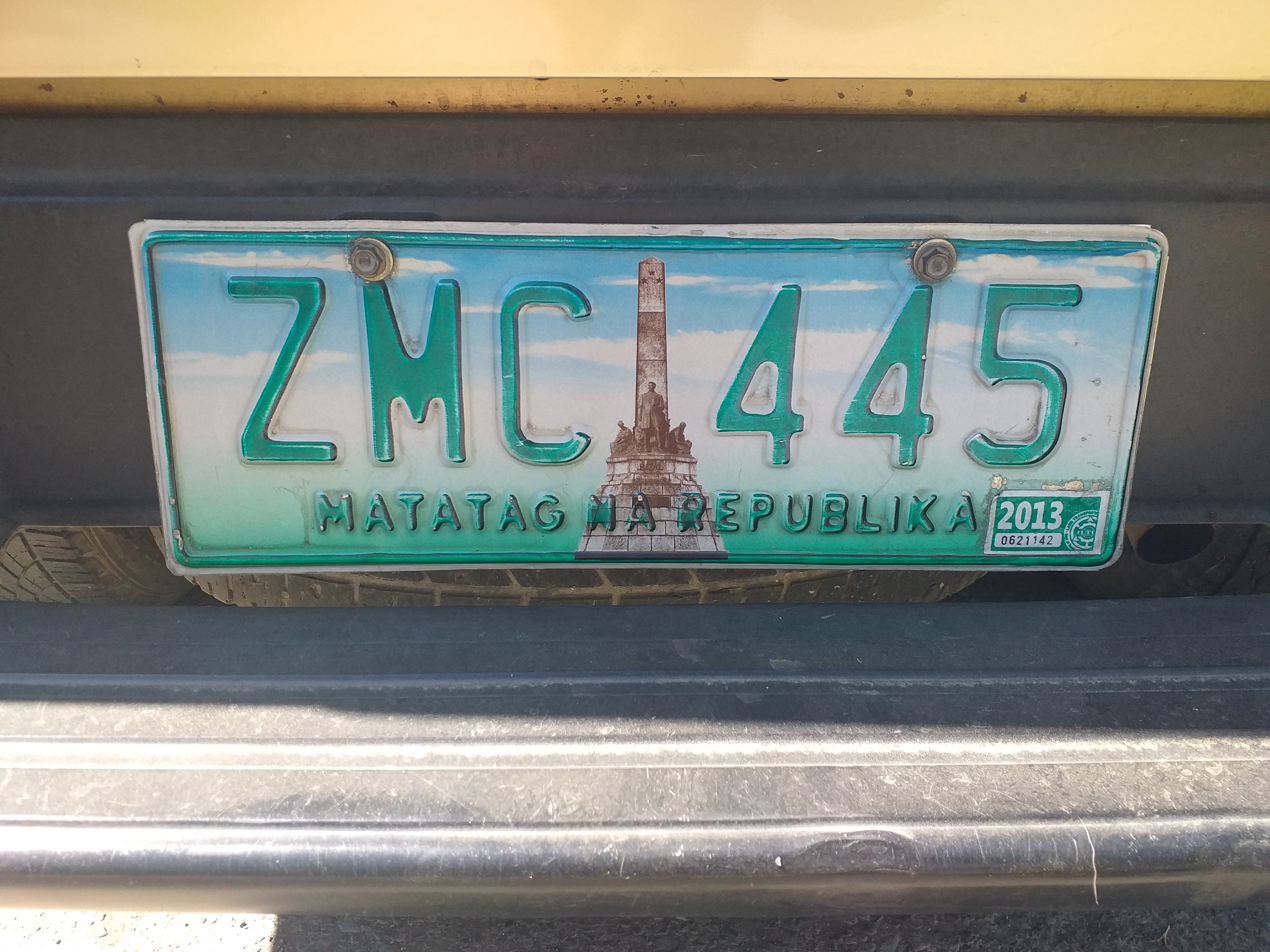
Private vehicle license plate produced in 2009.

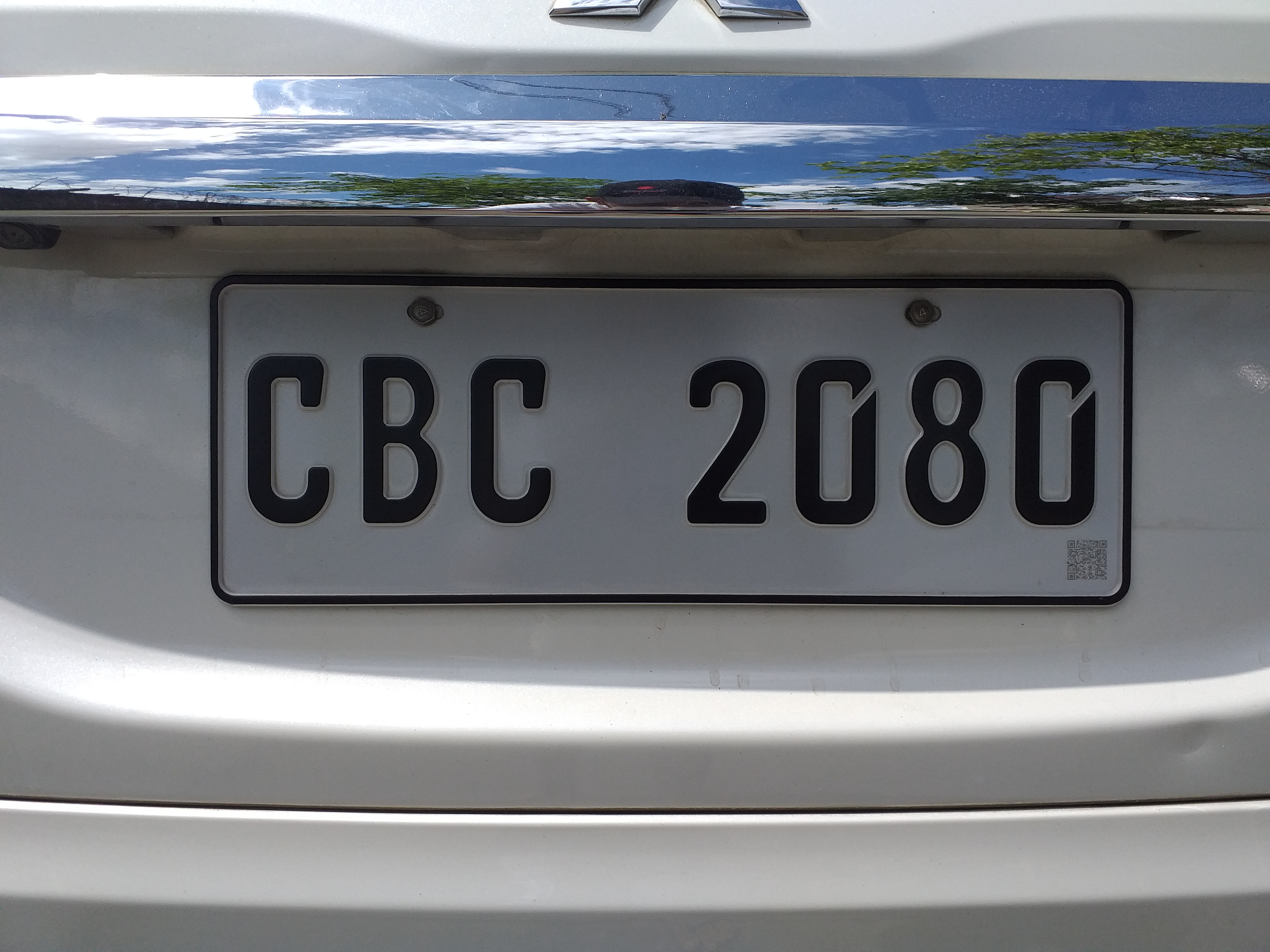
Private vehicle license plate produced in 2019.

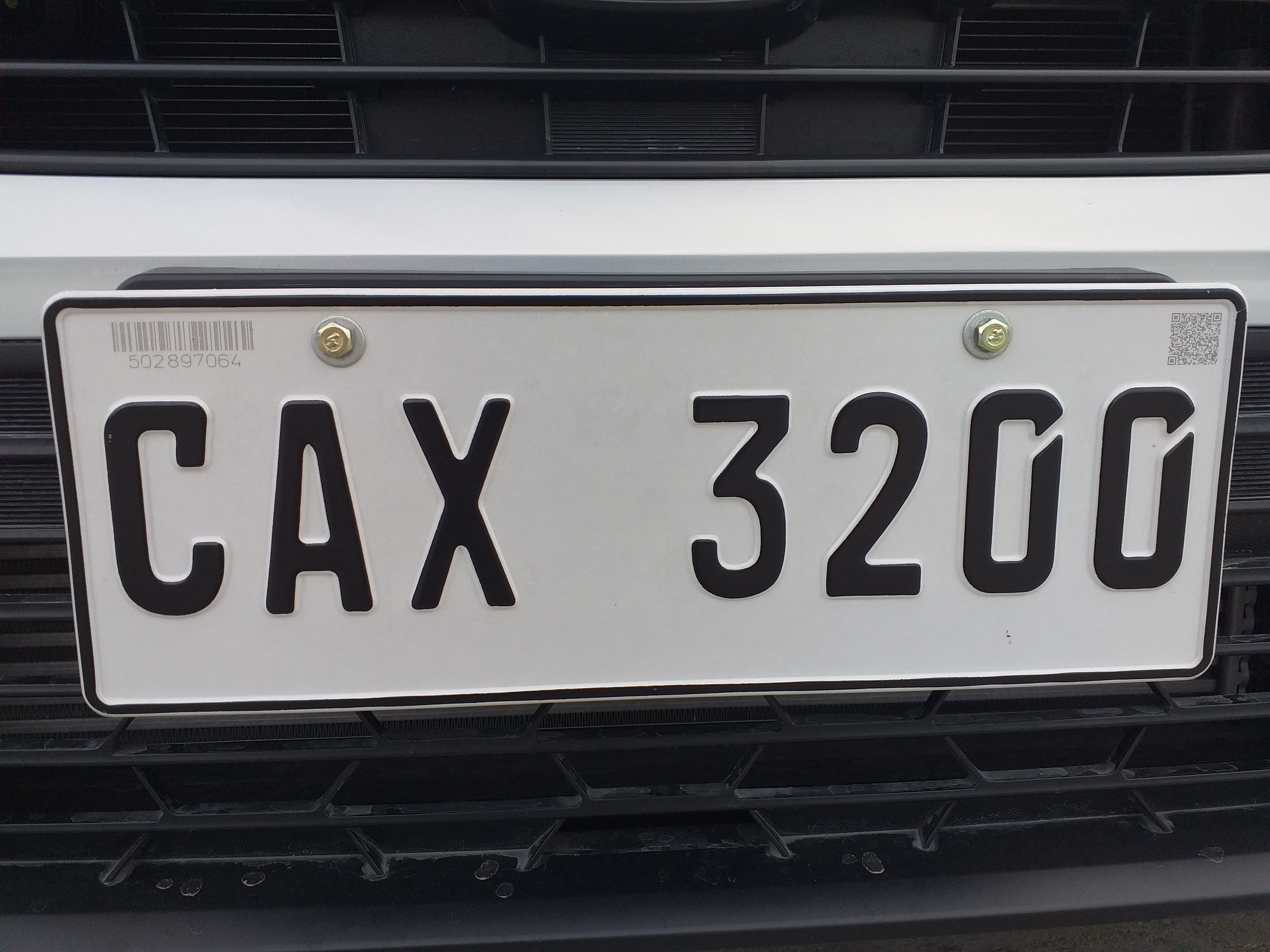
Private vehicle license plate produced in 2022.

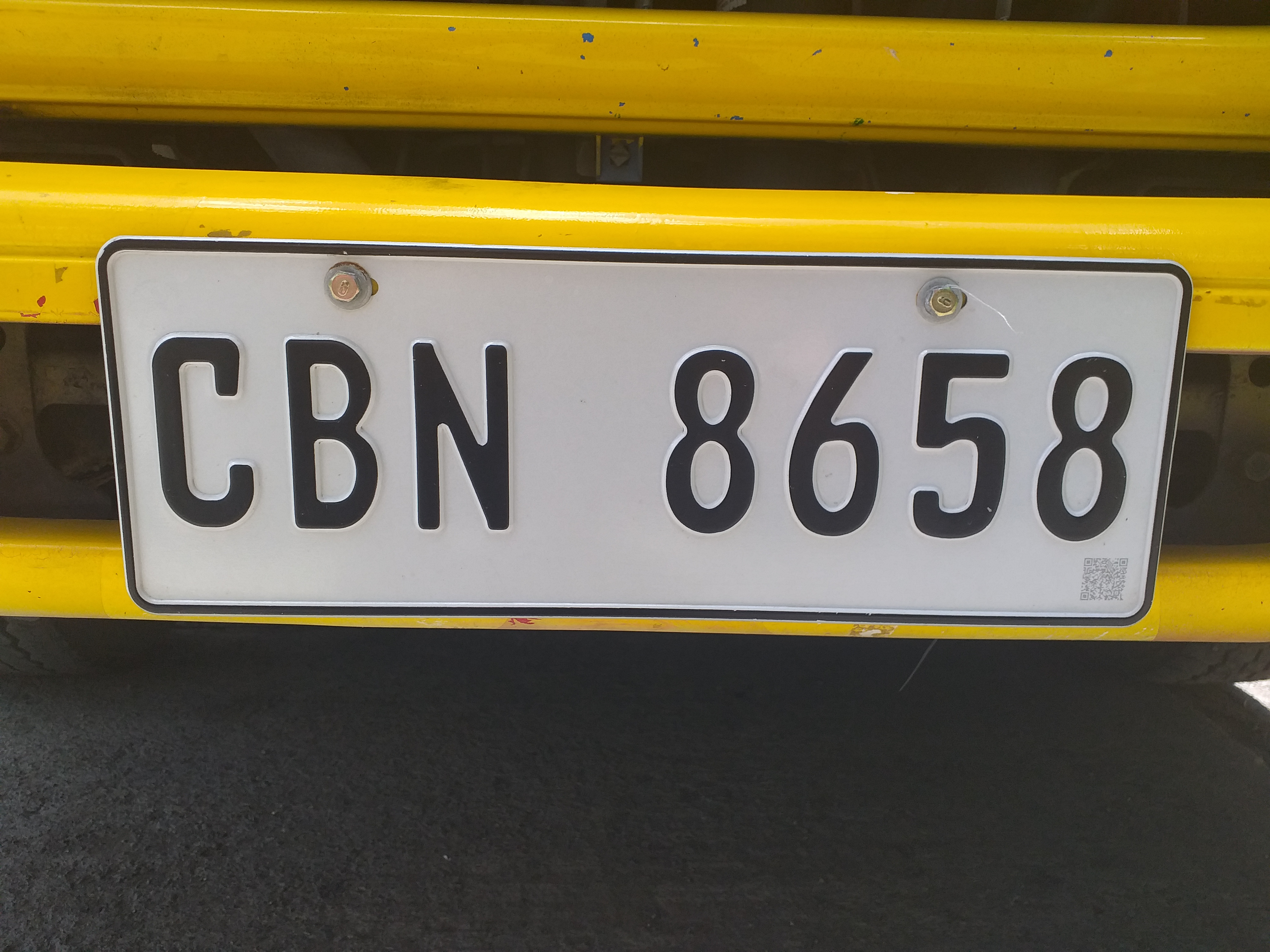
Private vehicle license plate produced in 2019.

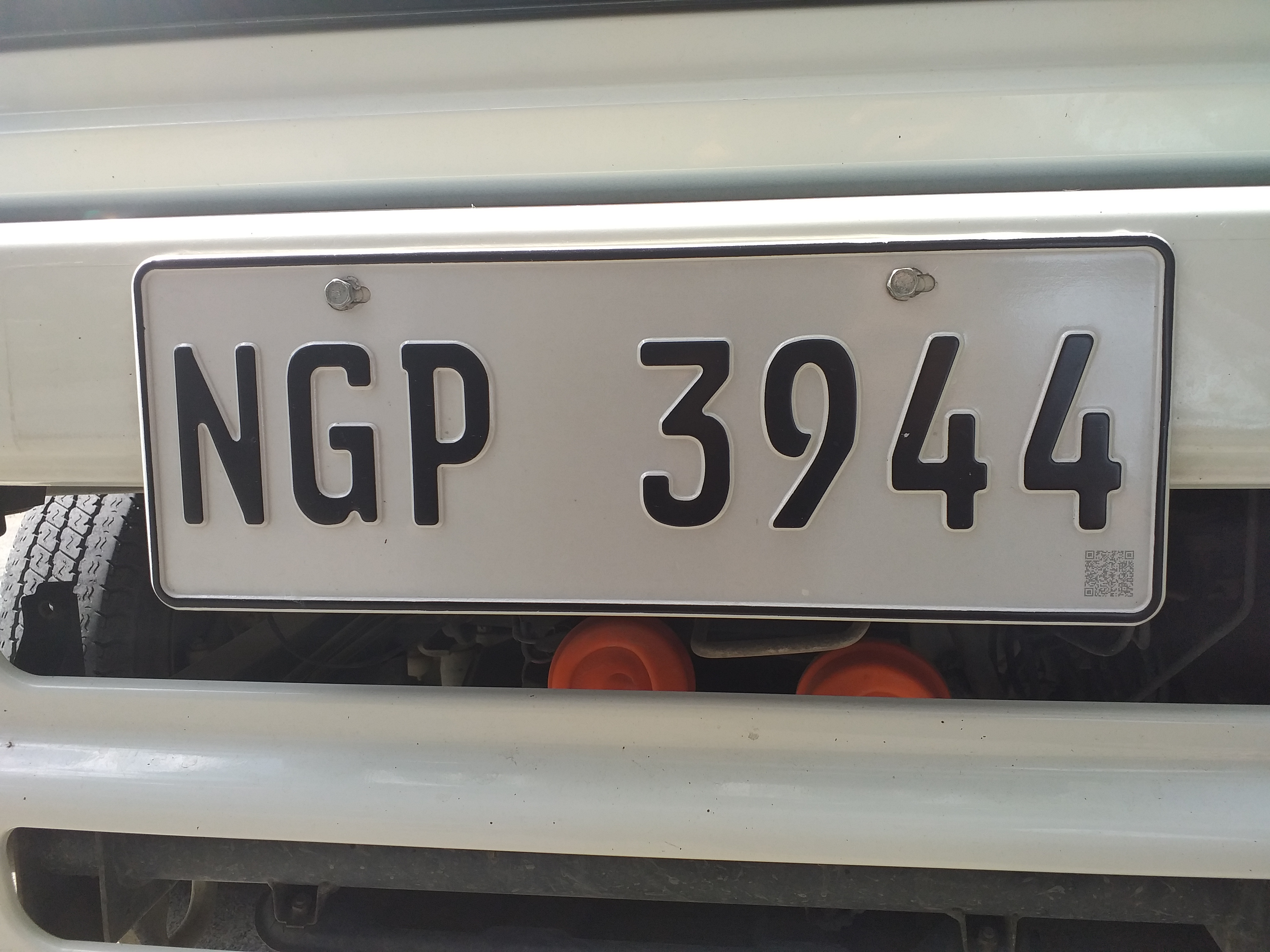
Private vehicle license plate produced in 2020 for National Capital Region.

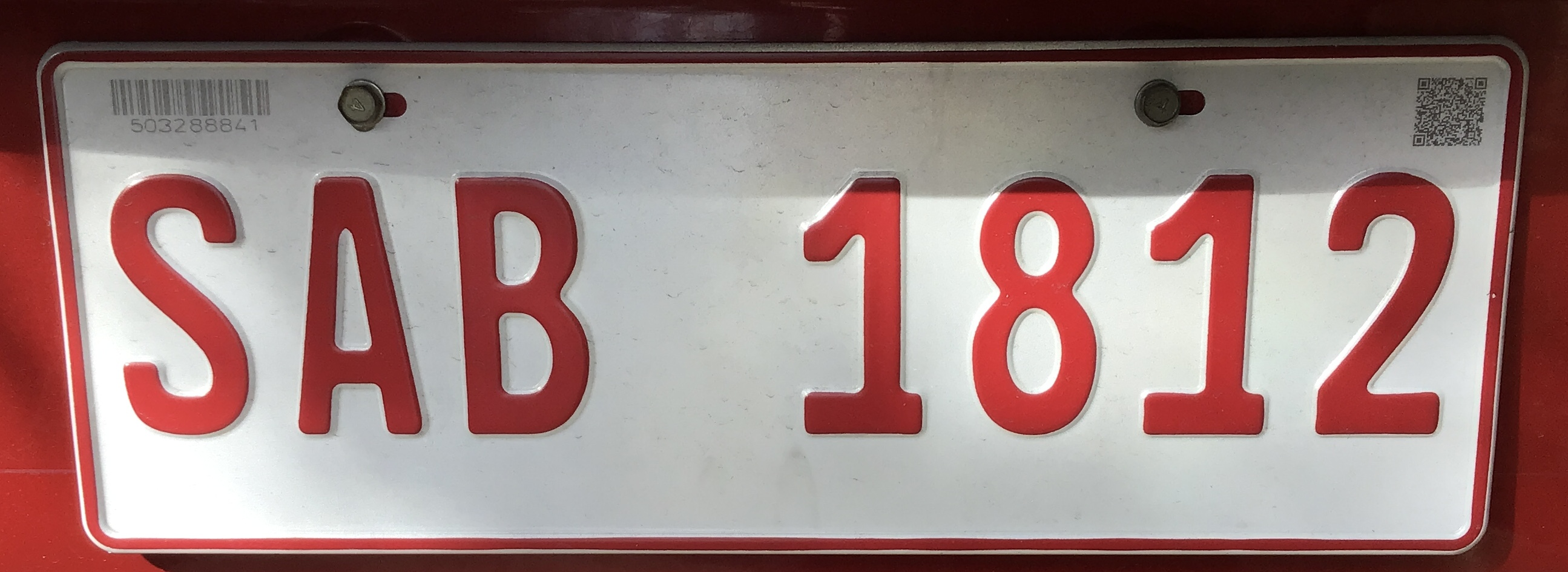
Government vehicle license plate produced in 2021, updated feature.
