= Vehicle size class =

Series of ratings assigned to different segments of automotive vehicles

Vehicle size classes are series of ratings assigned to different segments of automotive vehicles for the purposes of vehicle emissions control and fuel economy calculation. Various methods are used to classify vehicles; in North America, passenger vehicles are classified by total interior capacity while trucks are classified by gross vehicle weight rating (GVWR). Vehicle segments in the European Union use linear measurements to describe size. Asian vehicle classifications are a combination of dimensions and engine displacement.

== North America ==
=== United States ===
Vehicle classifications of four government agencies are in use in the United States: the United States Environmental Protection Agency (EPA), the National Highway Traffic Safety Administration (NHTSA as part of their NCAP program), Federal Highway Administration (FHWA), and the U.S. Census Bureau. The Insurance Institute for Highway Safety also has its own vehicle classification system that is used by most vehicle insurance companies in the U.S.

==== EPA ====
EPA size classes are defined in Federal Regulation, Title 40—Protection of Environment, Section 600.315-08 "Classes of comparable automobiles". This information is repeated in the Fuel Economy Guide. Passenger car classes are defined based on interior volume index (the combined passenger and cargo volume) and are as follows.

Vehicle size classes by U.S. Fuel Economy Guide for sedans
Class	Interior combined passenger and cargo volume index
Minicompact	< 85 cubic feet (2,405 L)
Subcompact	85–99.9 cubic feet (2,405–2,830 L)
Compact	100–109.9 cubic feet (2,830–3,110 L)
Mid-size	110–119.9 cubic feet (3,115–3,395 L)
Large	≥ 120 cubic feet (3,400 L)

Vehicle size classes by U.S. Fuel Economy Guide for station wagons
Class	Interior volume index
Small	< 130 cubic feet (3,680 L)
Midsize	130–159 cubic feet (3,680–4,500 L)
Large	≥ 160 cubic feet (4,530 L)

Trucks classes are defined by gross vehicle weight rating (GVWR). The administrator classifies light trucks (nonpassenger automobiles) into the following classes: Small pickup trucks, standard pickup trucks, vans, minivans, and SUVs. Starting in the 2013 model year, SUVs are divided between small sport utility vehicles and standard sport utility vehicles. Pickup trucks and SUVs are separated by car line on the basis of gross vehicle weight rating (GVWR). For a product line with more than one GVWR, the characteristic GVWR value for the product line is established by calculating the arithmetic average of all distinct GVWR values less than or equal to 8,500 pounds available for that product line.

Vehicle size classes by U.S. Fuel Economy Guide for trucks
Class	GVWR	
Pickup trucks	Small	< 6,000 lb (2,700 kg)
Pickup trucks	Standard	6,000–8,500 lb (2,700–3,850 kg)
Vans	Passenger	< 10,000 lb (4,550 kg)
Vans	Cargo	< 8,500 lb (3,850 kg)
Minivans	< 8,500 lb (3,850 kg)	
Sport utility vehicles	Small	< 6,000 lb (2,700 kg)
Sport utility vehicles	Standard	6,000–10,000 lb (2,700–4,550 kg)
Special purpose vehicles	< 8,500 lb (3,850 kg)	

Special purpose vehicles. All automobiles with GVWR less than or equal to 8,500 pounds and all medium-duty passenger vehicles which possess special features and which the administrator determines are more appropriately classified separately from typical automobiles.

==== NHTSA ====
Unlike the EPA, which groups automobiles by interior volume, the NHTSA groups cars for NCAP testing by weight class.

Vehicle size classes by NHTSA
Class
Passenger cars mini (PC/Mi) (1,500–1,999 lbs.)
Passenger cars light (PC/L) (2,000–2,499 lbs.)
Passenger cars compact (PC/C) (2,500–2,999 lbs.)
Passenger cars medium (PC/Me) (3,000–3,499 lbs.)
Passenger cars heavy (PC/H) (3,500 lbs. and over )
Sport utility vehicles (SUV)
Pickup trucks (PU) Vans (VAN)

==== FHWA ====
Developed in the 1980s, the Federal Highway Administration 13-category classification rule set is currently used for most federal reporting requirements and that serves as the basis for most state vehicle classification systems.

FHWA vehicle classification definitions
Class group	Class definition	Class includes	Number of axles
1	Motorcycles	Motorcycles	2
2	Passenger cars	All cars Cars with one-axle trailers Cars with two-axle trailers	2, 3, or 4
3	Other two-axle four-tire single-unit vehicles	Pick-ups and vans Pick-ups and vans with one- and two- axle trailers	2, 3
4	Buses	Two- and three-axle buses	2 or 3
5	Two-axle, six-tire, single-unit trucks	Two-axle trucks	2
6	Three-axle single-unit trucks	Three-axle trucks Three-axle tractors without trailers	3
7	Four or more axle single-unit trucks	Four-, five-, six- and seven-axle single-unit trucks	4 or more
8	Four or fewer axle single-trailer trucks	Two-axle trucks pulling one- and two-axle trailers Two-axle tractors pulling one- and two-axle trailers Three-axle tractors pulling one-axle trailers	3 or 4
9	Five-axle single-trailer trucks	Two-axle tractors pulling three-axle trailers Three-axle tractors pulling two-axle trailers Three-axle trucks pulling two-axle trailers	5
10	Six or more axle single-trailer trucks	Multiple configurations	6 or more
11	Five or fewer axle multi-trailer trucks	Multiple configurations	4 or 5
12	Six-axle multi-trailer trucks	Multiple configurations	6
13	Seven or more axle multi-trailer trucks	Multiple configurations	7 or more
14	Unused	----	----
15	Unclassified vehicle	Multiple configurations	2 or more

Source: Verification, Refinement, and Applicability of Long-Term Pavement Performance Vehicle Classification Rules, FHWA

==== U.S. Census Bureau ====
The Census Bureau surveys the United States truck population. Large truck owners (NHTSA classes 4–13) are given a standard survey, and small truck (pickups, vans, minivans, and sport utility vehicles) owners (NHTSA class 3) are given a short survey. In the United States the government agencies consider all pickups, vans, minivans, and sport utility vehicles to be trucks for regulatory purposes, no matter what construction method is used, either unibody or body on frame. Coupe utilities are considered pickup trucks in the U.S., not cars. SUVs are always considered trucks, although there are some CUVs with low ground clearance which are considered station wagon or hatchback cars for regulatory purposes.

==== IIHS ====
The Insurance Institute has its own crash test program and groups cars by curb weight and shadow into six classes, micro, mini, small, midsize, large and very large.

IIHS passenger car size classes.
Curb weight (pounds)	Shadow <70 sq ft	Shadow 70–79 sq ft	Shadow 80–89 sq ft	Shadow 90–99 sq ft	Shadow 100–109 sq ft	Shadow 110+ sq ft
4,000+	-	-	midsize	large	very large	very large
3,500 - 3,999	-	small	midsize	large	large	very large
3,000 - 3,499	-	small	midsize	midsize	large	
2,500 - 2,999	-	small	small	midsize		
2,000 - 2,499	-	mini	small			
<2,000	micro					

=== Canada ===
Cars are divided into six classes based on interior volume, as shown in the table below. These classes are not defined in Canadian regulations, but by the Fuel Consumption Guide published by Natural Resources Canada. An interior volume index is calculated from the combined passenger and trunk or cargo space. Pickup trucks, special purpose vehicles and vans are segmented in their own respective classes. As most Canadian cars share designs with American cars, Canada's classifications closely mirror those of the United States.

Class	Interior size in litres (cubic feet)
Two-seater	(Undefined)
Subcompact car	Under 2,830 (99.9)
Compact car	2,830–3,115 (99.9–110)
Mid-size car	3,115–3,400 (110–120)
Full-size car	Over 3,400 (120)

Vehicle classes for trucks are listed in On-Road Vehicle and Engine Emission Regulations (SOR/2003-2), published in Canada Gazette Part 2, Vol. 137 No. 1.

Class	GVWR in kg (pounds)	Curb weight in kg (pounds)	Frontal area in m^{2} (square feet)
Light light-duty truck	2,722 (6,000) or under	2,722 (6,000) or under	Max 4.2 (45.2)
Light-duty truck	3,856 (8,500) or under	2,722 (6,000) or under	Max 4.2 (45.2)
Heavy light-duty truck	Over 2,722–3,856 (6,000–8,500)	2,722 (6,000) or under	Max 4.2 (45.2)
Heavy-duty vehicle	Over 3,856 (8,500)	Over 2,722 (6,000)	Over 4.2 (45.2)
Medium-duty passenger vehicle	Same as heavy-duty vehicle	Under 4,536 (10,000)	Same as heavy-duty vehicle

Medium-duty passenger vehicle is classified as a heavy-duty vehicle that is designed primarily for the transportation of up to 12 people.

A motorcycle is classified as an on-road vehicle with a headlight, taillight and stoplight that has two or three wheels and a curb weight of 793 kg or less, but does not include a vehicle that has an engine displacement of less than 50 cc, or that, with an 80 kg (176 pound) driver:

- Cannot start from a dead stop using only the engine
- Cannot exceed a speed of 40 km/h on a level paved surface

== Europe ==
=== EEC ===
Vehicle segments in Europe do not have formal characterization or regulations. Models segments tend to be based on comparison to well-known brand models. For example, a car such as the Volkswagen Golf might be described as being in the Ford Focus size class, or vice versa. The VW Polo is smaller, so it belongs one segment below the Golf, while the bigger Passat is one segment above.

The names of the segments were mentioned, but not defined, in 1999 in an EU document titled Case No COMP/M.1406 Hyundai / Kia Regulation (EEC) No 4064/89 Merger Procedure.

- A: mini cars
- B: small cars
- C: medium cars
- D: large cars
- E: executive cars
- F: luxury cars
- J: sport utility cars (including off-road vehicles)
- M: Multi purpose cars
- S: Sports cars

=== Euro NCAP ===
Euro NCAP applies a standard safety test to all new cars, the results are listed in separate categories to allow prospective vehicle purchasers to compare models of a similar size and shape:

- Small family cars (also for stand-alone saloon superminis, like the Dacia Logan)
- Large family cars (includes compact executive cars)
- Executive cars (for expensive cars over 4.80 m long)
- Roadsters
- Small off-roaders (similar to the North American crossover SUV category)
- Large off-roaders (similar to the North American SUV category)
- Small MPVs (both mini MPVs and compact MPVs)
- Large MPVs

== Asia ==
=== China ===
Vehicle size categories for passenger vehicles for the China NCAP program as defined by the China Automotive Technology and Research Center (CATARC) may appear similar to the European system, but are closer to the Japanese in application.

- Category A (A-segment) vehicles are two-box vehicles of between 4 and 4.5 meters in length, or three-box vehicles (i.e., sedans with trunks) with engines of less than 1600 cc.
- Category B (B-segment) vehicles are longer than 4.5 m in length with engines of over 1600 cc.
- Multi-purpose vehicles, or MPVs
- Sport utility vehicles or SUVs

=== India ===
The Society of Indian Automobile Manufacturers (SIAM) divides Indian passenger vehicles into the segments A1, A2, A3, A4, A5, A6, B1, B2 and SUV. The classification is done solely based on the length of the vehicle. The details of the segments are below:

Car segment	Length of the car	Classification	Car model belonging to the segment
A1	Up to 3,400 mm	Ultracompact cars (A)	Suzuki Alto, Tata Nano, Mahindra e2o
A2	3,401 to 4,000 mm	Sub-four metre (B)	Maruti Suzuki Wagon R, Hyundai i10, Suzuki Swift, Suzuki Baleno (subcompact), Hyundai Xcent, Honda Amaze, Maruti Suzuki Dzire, Ford Aspire, Mahindra Verito, Hyundai i20, Tata Zest
A3	4,001 to 4,500 mm	Entry-level mid-size sedans (C)	Hyundai Verna, Honda City, Suzuki Ciaz
A4	4,501 to 4,700 mm	Small family cars (C)	Toyota Corolla, Škoda Octavia, Chevrolet Cruze
A5	4,701 to 5,000 mm	Mid-size (D); Executive cars (E)	D-segment: Toyota Camry, Škoda Superb; E-segment: Mercedes-Benz E-Class, BMW 5 series
A6	More than 5,000 mm	Grand saloons (F)	Mercedes-Benz S-Class, Audi A8, BMW 7 series, Jaguar XJ
B1	<4,001 mm	Small vans	Maruti Omni, Tata Venture
B2	>4,000 mm	Mid-size MPVs/minivans	Toyota Innova, Suzuki Ertiga, Mahindra Marazzo, Kia Carnival
SUV	Any	SUVs	Renault Duster, Honda CR-V, Ford Endeavour, Hyundai Creta, Audi Q7, Toyota Land Cruiser

=== Japan ===
Vehicle size classes in Japan are rather simple compared to other regions. The classifications were established under the Japanese Government's Road Vehicle Act of 1951. There are just three different classes defined by regulations. The dimension regulations are enforced to exact measurements. These standards of classification are enforced on all vehicles within the jurisdiction of Japan, and no special consideration is made for the vehicles' origin of manufacture. The Japanese law regulates all vehicles that do not travel on railroads (traditional or maglev), or are not powered by physically contacting overhead power lines. The law regulates vehicles that are powered by an autonomous power source. Smaller cars are more popular in Japan due to the confined driving conditions and speed limits.

- Keijidosha (light cars): Buyers of Kei cars enjoy a number of tax, registration and other benefits to encourage the purchase of these tiny vehicles (among road vehicles requiring a license only). Regulations have been updated a number of times over the years to allow larger, more powerful cars to be developed and maintain demand as buyers become more affluent, and to improve collision protection performance. The current regulations state that a kei car is a vehicle less than 3.4 m (11.2 ft) long, 1.48 m (4.9 ft) wide, 2 m (6.6 ft) high, with a maximum engine displacement of 660 cc (40.3 cu in) and maximum power of 64 PS (47 kW; 63 hp). Extra small microcars are available with an engine size no larger than 49 cc (2.99 cu in), identified with a light blue license plate and blue text.
- Small size Passenger vehicles, commonly called "5 number" vehicles in reference to their license-plate prefix. This class is defined as limited to vehicles less than 4.7 m (15.4 ft) long, 1.7 m (5.6 ft) wide, 2 m (6.6 ft) high and with engine displacement of no more than 2,000 cc (122.0 cu in). Vans, trucks and station wagons (considered commercial vehicles in Japan) in the compact size class receive a "4 number" license prefix. Before 1989, the annual tax rate of normal-size class was more than doubled of this class so that most Japanese cars were built within small-size class requirement. Now the annual tax rate only varies with engine displacement however useful small-size class cars are still popular in Japanese market, and Japanese manufacturers make regular improvements to compact sized products to maximize interior accommodation while remaining within the exterior boundaries.
- Normal-size passenger vehicles, commonly called "3 number" in reference to their license-plate prefix (trucks and buses over 2000 cc have license plates numbers beginning with 1 and 2 respectively), are those more than 4.7 m (15.4 ft) long, 1.7 m (5.6 ft) wide, 2.0 m (6.6 ft) high and/or with engine displacement exceeding 2,000 cc (122.0 cu in). This regulation also mandates that passenger vehicles for private use may not exceed 6 m (19.7 ft) length or 2 m (6.6 ft) width. Based on market conditions, vehicles such as the first generation Honda Legend (shorter and narrower V6Gi and V6Zi variants with a 2.0 V6 engine), and the Mitsubishi Starion were produced in both "compact size" (just under 4.7 m long and 1.7 m wide) for the Japanese market, and longer or wider "passenger size" versions, primarily for export.

Motorcycles also have classification definitions based on engine size:

Class I moped
Engine size must be at or less than 50 cc, identified by blue text and white extra small license plate.
Class II moped (B)
Engine size is between 50 and 90 cc, identified by blue text and yellow extra small license plate.
Class II moped (MIG)
Engine size is between 90 and 125 cc, identified by blue text and pink extra small license plate (colour of plate can vary according to regional requirements)
Motorcycle light
Engine size is between 125 and 250 cc, identified by green text and white small license plate.
Motorcycle medium
Engine size is between 250 and 400 cc, identified by green outline and green text with white small license plate.
Motorcycle large
Engine size is over 400 cc, identified by green outline and green text with white small license plate.

All vehicles with an engine displacement over 250 cc are required to undergo an inspection (called "Shaken" in Japan). Vehicle weight tax and mandatory vehicle insurance are usually paid at this time. This is separate from the road tax paid yearly. The road tax varies from ¥3,000 for kei cars up to ¥22,000 for normal size cars with 4.6L engines.

== Oceania ==
=== Australia ===
SUV (includes crossover SUVs) size, exterior vehicle length (excluding rear mounted spare wheel/tyre) multiplied by exterior vehicle width (excluding mirrors), both in millimetres.

- Small/Light SUV: less than 8.1 m^{2} (87 sq ft)
- Medium SUV: 8.1 to 8.8 m^{2} (87 to 95 sq ft)
- Large SUV: 8.8 to 9.8 m^{2} (95 to 105 sq ft)
- Upper/Extra large SUV: more than 9.8 m^{2} (105 sq ft)

== See also ==
- Car body style
- Car classification
- Directive 2001/116/EC
- Tax horsepower
- Truck classification
- Vehicle category
