= Japanese used vehicle exporting =

Grey market international trade

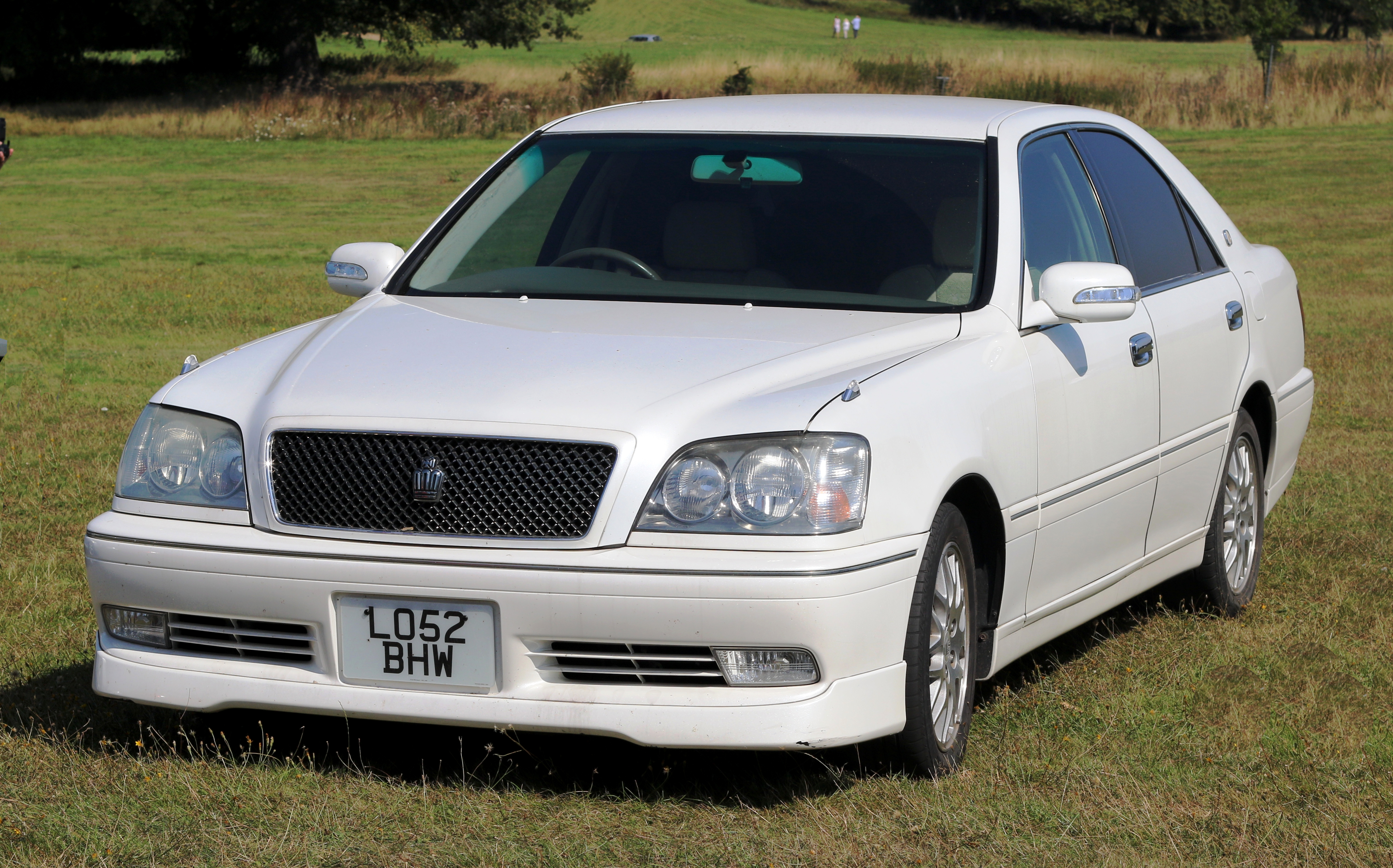
A Japanese-market Toyota Crown S170 in the United Kingdom. The model has never seen an official release in the country and was registered in May 2019

Japanese used vehicle exporting is a grey market international trade involving the export of used cars and other vehicles from Japan to other markets around the world since the 1980s.

Despite the high cost of transport, the sale of used cars and other vehicles to other countries is still profitable due to the relatively low cost and good condition of the vehicles being purchased. Contributing factors to the feasibility of such export include Japan's strict motor-vehicle inspections and high depreciation which make such vehicles worth very little in Japan after six years. Japan has strict environmental protection regulations that make vehicle disposal very expensive, as well as stringent vehicle emission test standards that increase the costs of owning a used vehicle.

Nearly 1.4 million used vehicles were exported from Japan in 2006. The most popular destinations for used cars from Japan are Antigua and Barbuda, Australia, Bahamas, Bangladesh, Barbados, Brunei, Cambodia, Canada, Dominica, Eswatini, Georgia, Grenada, Guyana, Hong Kong, Indonesia, Ireland, Jamaica, Kazakhstan, Kenya, Laos, Lesotho, Malawi, Malaysia, Mauritius, Mongolia, Mozambique, Myanmar, New Zealand, Pakistan, Russia, Saint Kitts and Nevis, Saint Lucia, Saint Vincent and the Grenadines, Sri Lanka, South Korea, Suriname, Tanzania, Thailand, Trinidad and Tobago, Uganda, United Kingdom, United States of America, Zambia, and Zimbabwe. Additionally, Chile, South Africa, Singapore, and the United Arab Emirates are used as popular transit hubs.

== Overview ==
=== Supply of used cars ===
In Japan, used cars are mainly sold at auto auctions by car owners and dealers. At auto auctions, owners are hidden from bidders while the auctioneers provide independent car evaluations called inspection sheets. Exporters, acting as bidding agents for importers, use the auto auctions as their main supply. There are over 200 auto auction groups operating throughout Japan including JAA, JU Group, TAA, USS, and ZIP.

Besides auto auctions, Japanese exports have access to vehicles from dealerships and private sellers.

=== Exporting methods ===
Vehicles which will be exported from Japan must be prepared before shipping. This includes de-registering the vehicle with the government, getting an export certificate, and cleaning the car to remove biosecurity risks. Car cleaning is especially necessary for the Australian Quarantine and Inspection Service (AQIS) and New Zealand's Ministry of Primary Industries (MPI) agencies' clearances.

Exporters can ship the car that is ready by ro-ro or container according to customer specification, ship schedules, and the capabilities of the destination port.

=== Market differences ===
The suitability of Japan's domestically sold cars for export to other countries is constrained by various factors. Vehicles in Japan have right-hand drive—the steering wheel is on the right side of the vehicle—in accord with Japan's left-hand traffic. Some countries with right-hand traffic permit right-hand drive vehicles, though right-traffic headlamps are generally unavailable for models exclusive to Japan. Some countries with right traffic do not allow right-hand drive cars, but in some such markets the extensive labor required to convert a car to left-hand drive is economically feasible; such conversions are sometimes done by the local importers. The Philippines is an example of a market where such conversion is common, until recently, when the importation of such used vehicles (except for heavy vehicles) was banned by E0 156. Japan's automobile safety regulations also differ substantially from the ECE Regulations used throughout most of the world and the North American regulations that apply in the United States and Canada.

Vehicle components such as windows and windshields, seat belts, lamps and reflectors, and mirrors, as well as design features for crashworthiness such as bumpers, fuel tanks, and structural rigidity of vehicles meant for the Japanese market may not comply with non-Japanese standards. They often lack structural reinforcements needed to meet side-impact crashworthiness standards in effect outside Japan. Moreover, entire categories of vehicle, such as Kei cars, do not exist in regulations outside Japan.

=== Responsibilities ===
Generally, most exporters are responsible for the organization and completion of the vehicle's transportation until it arrives at the importer's Port of Destination (POD). At the POD, possession of the vehicle, and the responsibility of possession, is laid on the importer. Financial responsibility, on the other hand, is transferred when ownership is handed over. Ownership is switched after the car has been purchased and before being exported. In the case of damage or losses occurring during shipping, the buyer bears all financial loss.

== Restrictions ==
All vehicles must be de-registered prior to being exported from Japan. This is usually the responsibility of the car exporter. A mileage certificate is also provided to prove the registered mileage of the vehicle.

=== Argentina ===
Used vehicles that arrive to Argentina must be at least 30 years or older and have a price value of US$12.000. However, another way to import a used car to the country is by repatriation, which doesn't take the vehicles' age into consideration.

=== Bangladesh ===
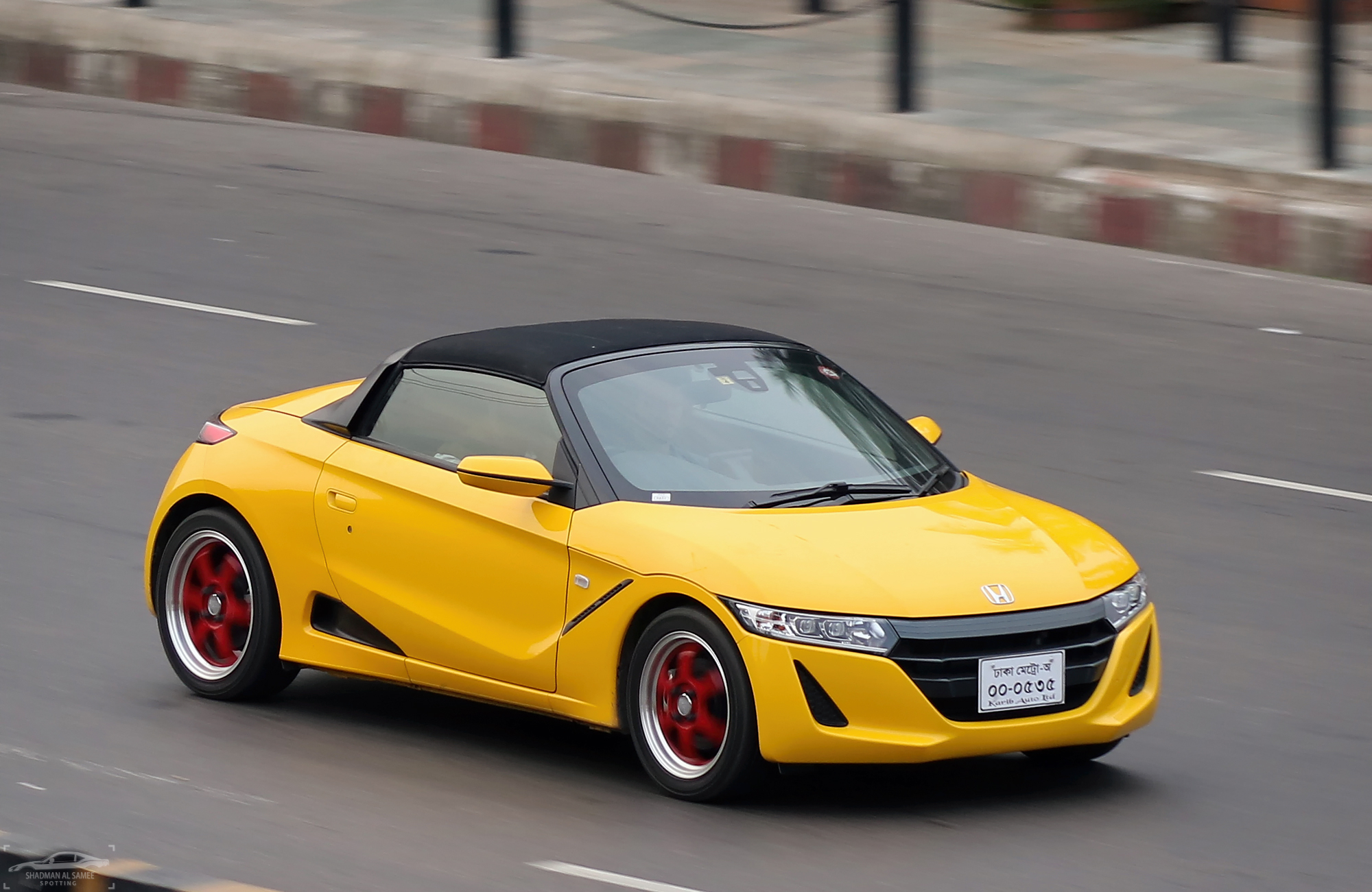
Honda S660 in Dhaka

Bangladesh maintains specific rules and regulations for the import of used vehicles, particularly from Japan, one of the major sources of such imports. The importation of used private cars, microbuses, SUVs, and jeeps is restricted to vehicles not older than five years from the date of manufacture. Reconditioned vehicles are permitted, provided they undergo reconditioning before importation and meet the standards set by the Bangladesh government. Import duties, which vary based on engine displacement, age, and vehicle type, include customs duty, supplementary duty, value-added tax (VAT), advanced income tax (AIT), and regulatory duty. A depreciation allowance is available, reducing the taxable value based on the vehicle's age.

Imported vehicles must have a fitness certificate from Japan, along with necessary documents such as a Bill of Lading, commercial invoice, and JAAI (Japan Automobile Appraisal Institute) certificate. Pre-shipment inspections may be required to ensure compliance with Bangladesh's safety and environmental standards. Import restrictions include a prohibition on left-hand drive vehicles and the import of salvage or significantly damaged vehicles. Imported vehicles typically enter through the Chattogram or Mongla ports and must be registered with the Bangladesh Road Transport Authority (BRTA) following a roadworthiness test.

=== Canada ===
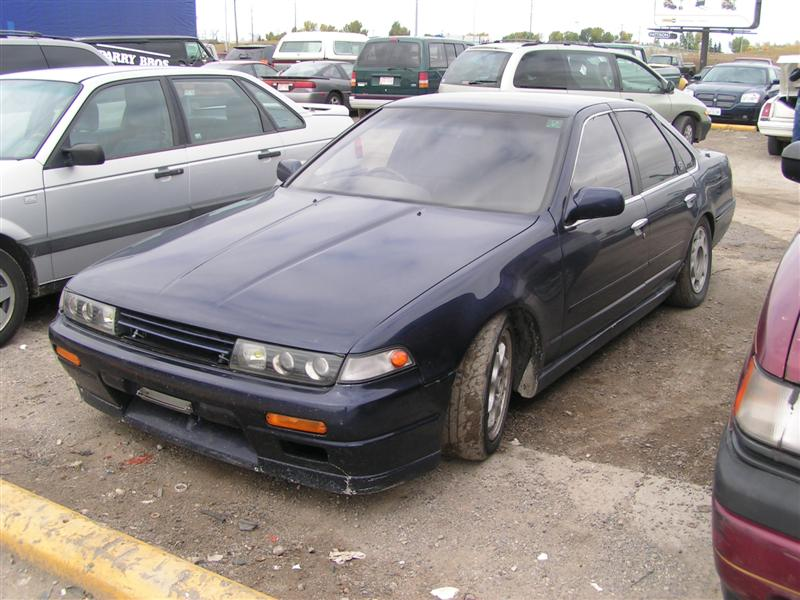
Nissan Cefiro, imported from Japan and registered in Alberta

Any vehicle more than 15 years old may be imported into Canada without regard to its compliance with Canada Motor Vehicle Safety Standards. Vehicles are registered at the provincial level in Canada, and increasingly stringent sub-national vehicle safety requirements make it difficult to register a Japanese-market vehicle without replacement or modifications to the headlamps and other lights and reflectors, window glass, tires, seatbelts and other equipment.

=== Cayman Islands ===
The Cayman Islands government announced on 1 May 2023 that the cabinet approved, on 25 April 2023, changes in Customs and Border Control (Prohibited Goods) (Amendment) Order, 2023 that restrict the importation of used vehicles from 2016 to 2023. Exceptions are made for classic/antique vehicles and vehicles meant for agricultural work, construction, maintenance or engineering vehicles older than 8 years.

=== Chile ===
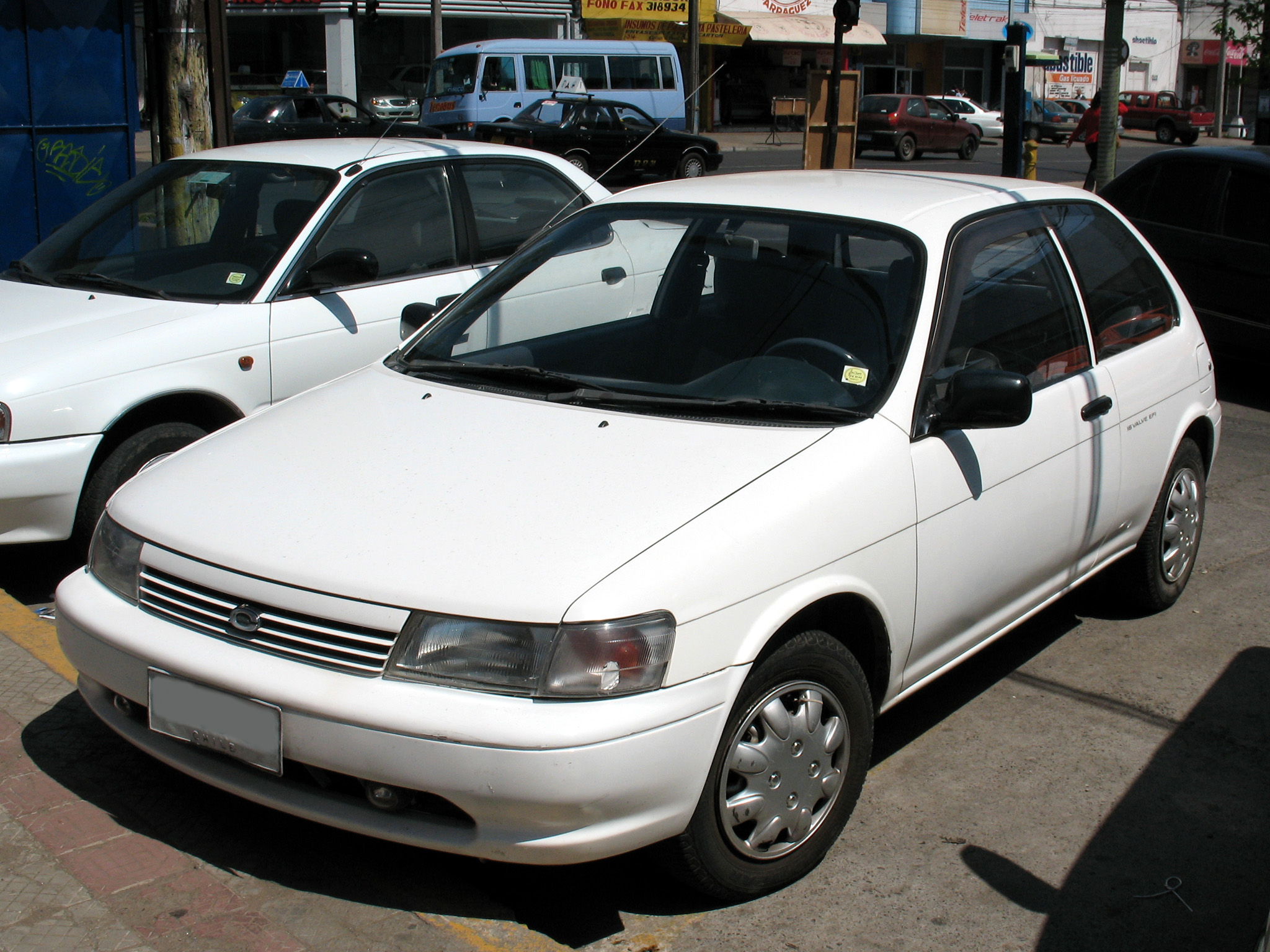
A Toyota Corolla II switched to LHD and registered in Chile

In Chile, second hand imported vehicles may only be registered in the extreme regions of Arica and Parinacota, Tarapacá, Aisén and Magallanes. Japanese used vehicles must meet emission standards and be converted to left hand drive.

However, a big market of non converted cars exists in the duty-free zone of Iquique, where customers from other countries buy them and sometimes drive them home.

=== Greece ===
In Greece, second hand vehicles are allowed but they cannot be older than three years old (ambulance or fire engine vehicles cannot be older than six years old), have to meet emission standards and be left hand drive. Right hand drive vehicles and tourist vehicles older than six years old that enter Greece from neighboring countries are usually towed to borders where they are allowed.

=== Hong Kong ===
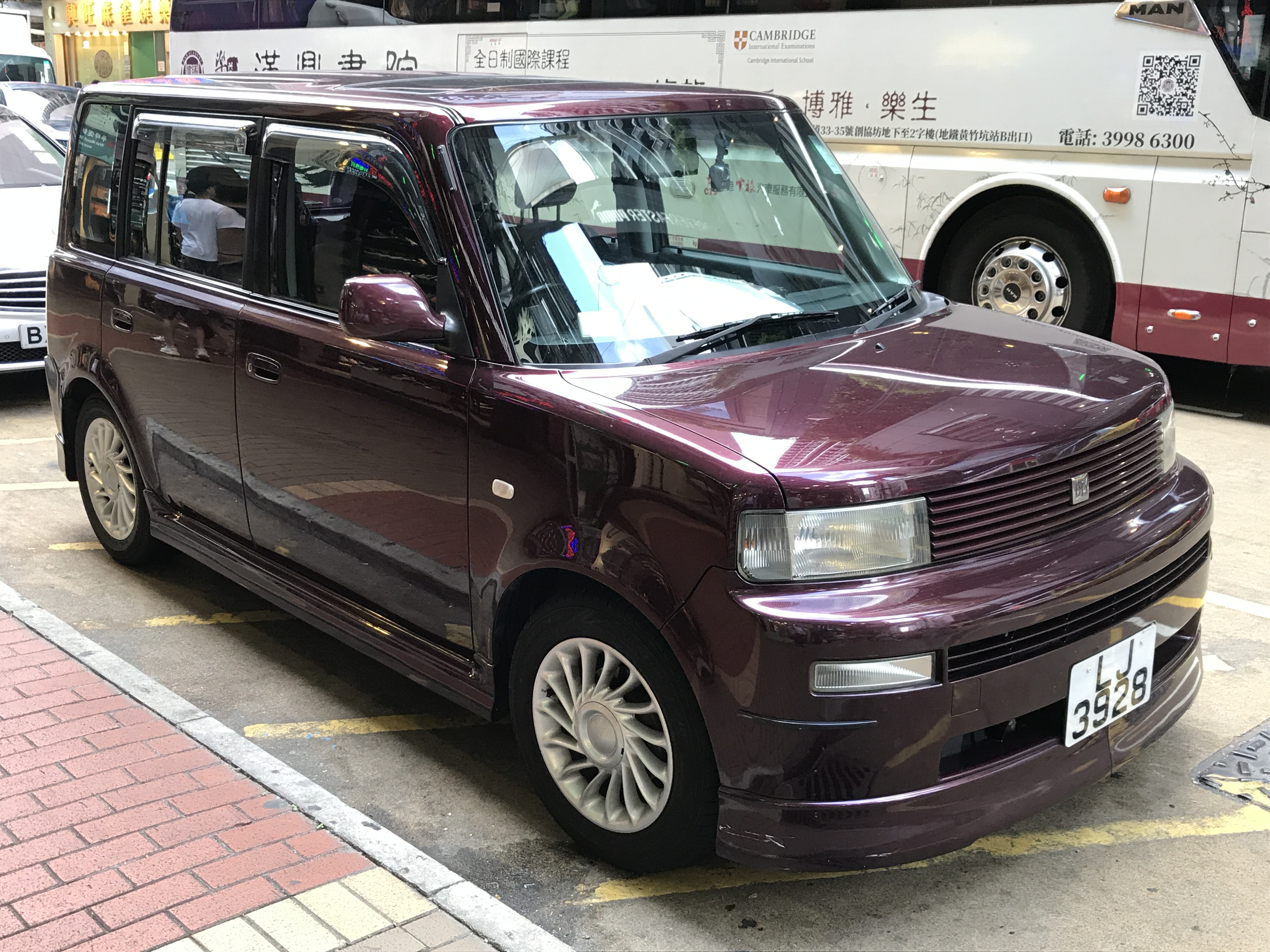
2002 Toyota bB, Japan Domestic version, exported and registered in Hong Kong.

Many used cars from Japan are registered in Hong Kong, including both Japanese makes and even European makes, since both Hong Kong and Japan are right hand drive. In order to register the car in Hong Kong, the car must be less than seven years old, gasoline powered, meet Euro VIc emission and noise standards, with E-mark for all glass and safety belts, and an unleaded-fuel restrictor installed (if not already present).

For cars over 20 years old, they can be imported as classic cars and not have to meet Euro VIc emission standards.

If a Japanese used car is fitted with privacy windows, it must be converted to clear glass in order to be registered in Hong Kong.

=== Ireland ===
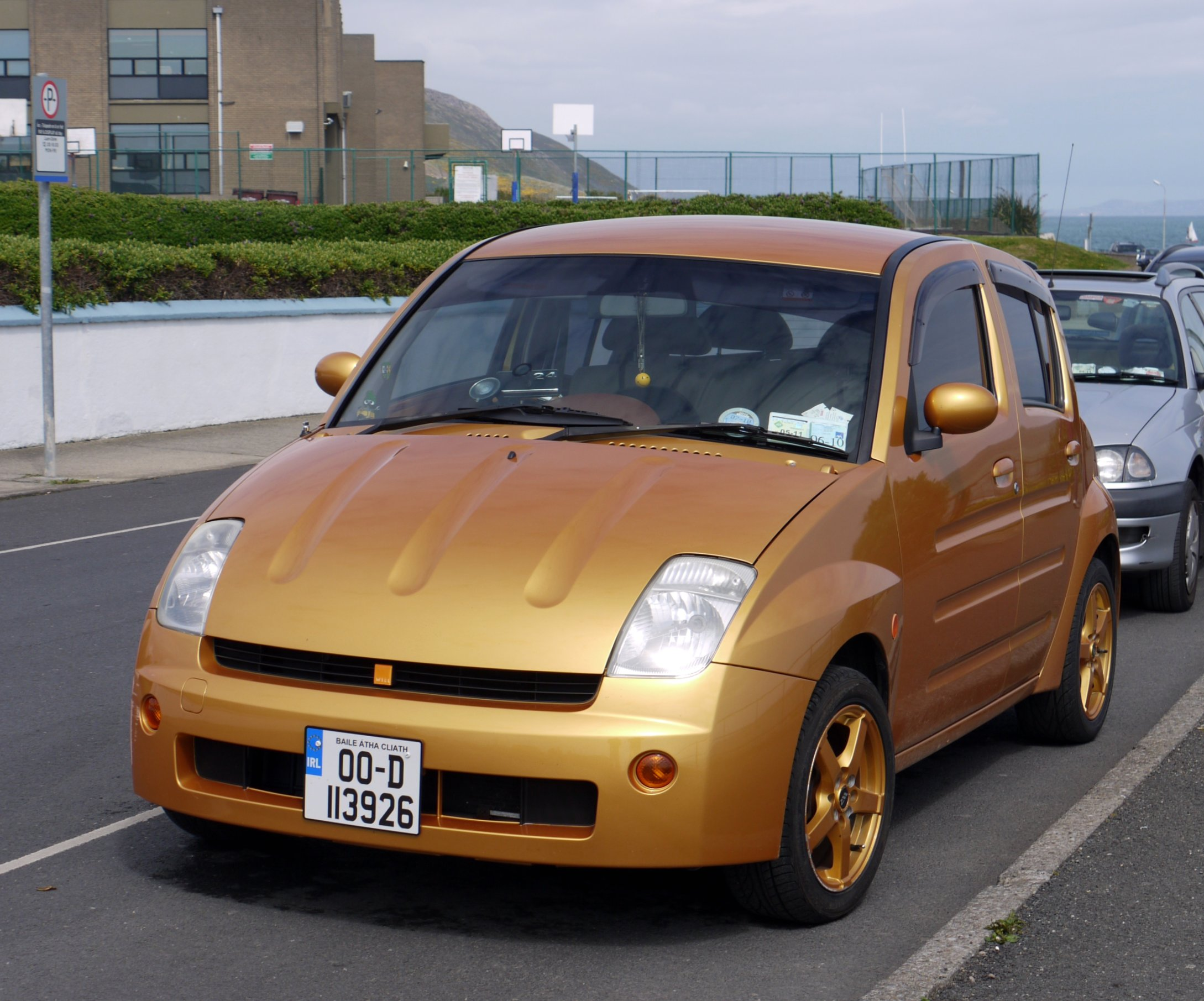
Toyota WiLL Vi in Dublin

Ireland has relatively loose vehicle importing laws for Japanese cars. To keep imports down, Irish Revenue Commissioners require all new and imported cars to pay the VRT. Also, every car, both domestic and imported over four years old must pass the stringent National Car Test (NCT) in order to be given a road worthiness certificate. In the case of cars imported from Japan, all glass, tyres, noise, must meet EU approved levels.

Imported Japanese used cars are easily recognisable as their rear Irish number plates are square in form and not the rectangular regular issued plates. This is because cars for the Japanese market have square recesses in the rear to accommodate Japanese plates.

=== Kenya ===
In Kenya, second-hand imported Japanese vehicles must undergo a worthiness inspection conducted by the Quality Inspection Services Japan as per mandate from the Kenya Bureau of Standards. The inspection aims to ensure that the vehicles are not more than eight years old, have genuine mileage and that the vehicles pass a safety and mechanical inspection as per the standards set by KEBS. Guide to Kenya Car Import Regulations

=== Macau ===
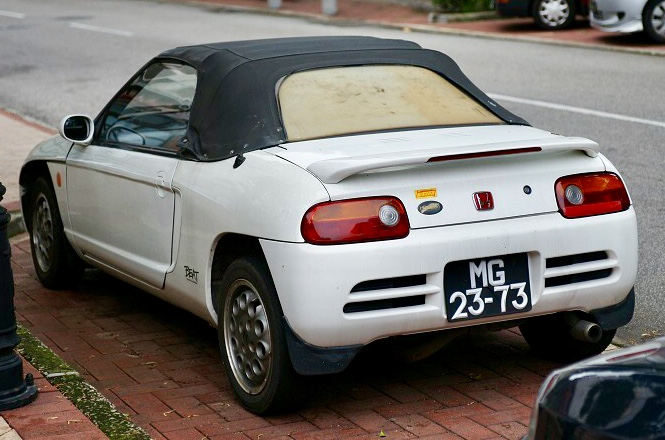
Honda Beat in Macau

Although Macau is right hand drive, it does not allow imports of used cars from Japan or any other country, see Macau Official Info (Chinese and Portuguese only) unlike Hong Kong. However, brand new parallel imported cars from Japan are allowed in Macau.

=== Malta ===
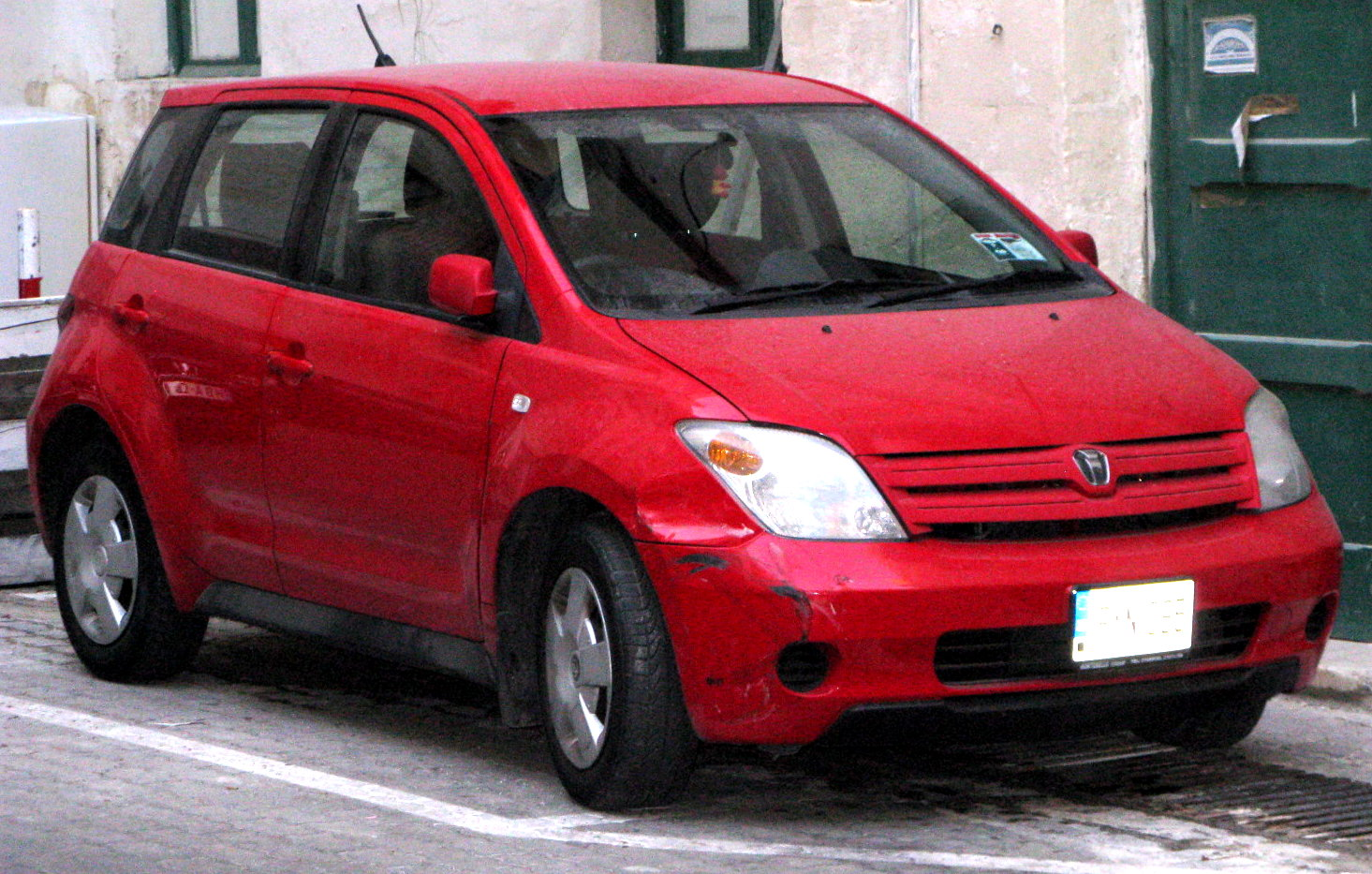
Toyota ist, registered in Malta

In Malta, second-hand imported Japanese vehicles must comply with Road Worthiness regulations which address Emissions, Lights Operability & Mechanical Operability. Vehicles thus in compliance can be imported and registered. Some Maltese importers apply corrosion protection to these vehicles due to the hot, humid climate.

=== Mozambique ===
In Mozambique, most of the cars in the roads are imported from Japan, where Toyota takes the lead in terms of brand. All cars to be imported to Mozambique must undergo a pre-inspection process in Japan performed by Intertek. The inspection will determinate the condition of the car to be imported and the right value of the car for custom clearance proposes.

The customs clearance amount will depend on the type of car, engine size, number of seats and propose of use, and can cost up to 84% of the CIF of the Vehicle. Added to the custom clearance, the importer will pay up 650 USD of port fees.

=== New Zealand ===
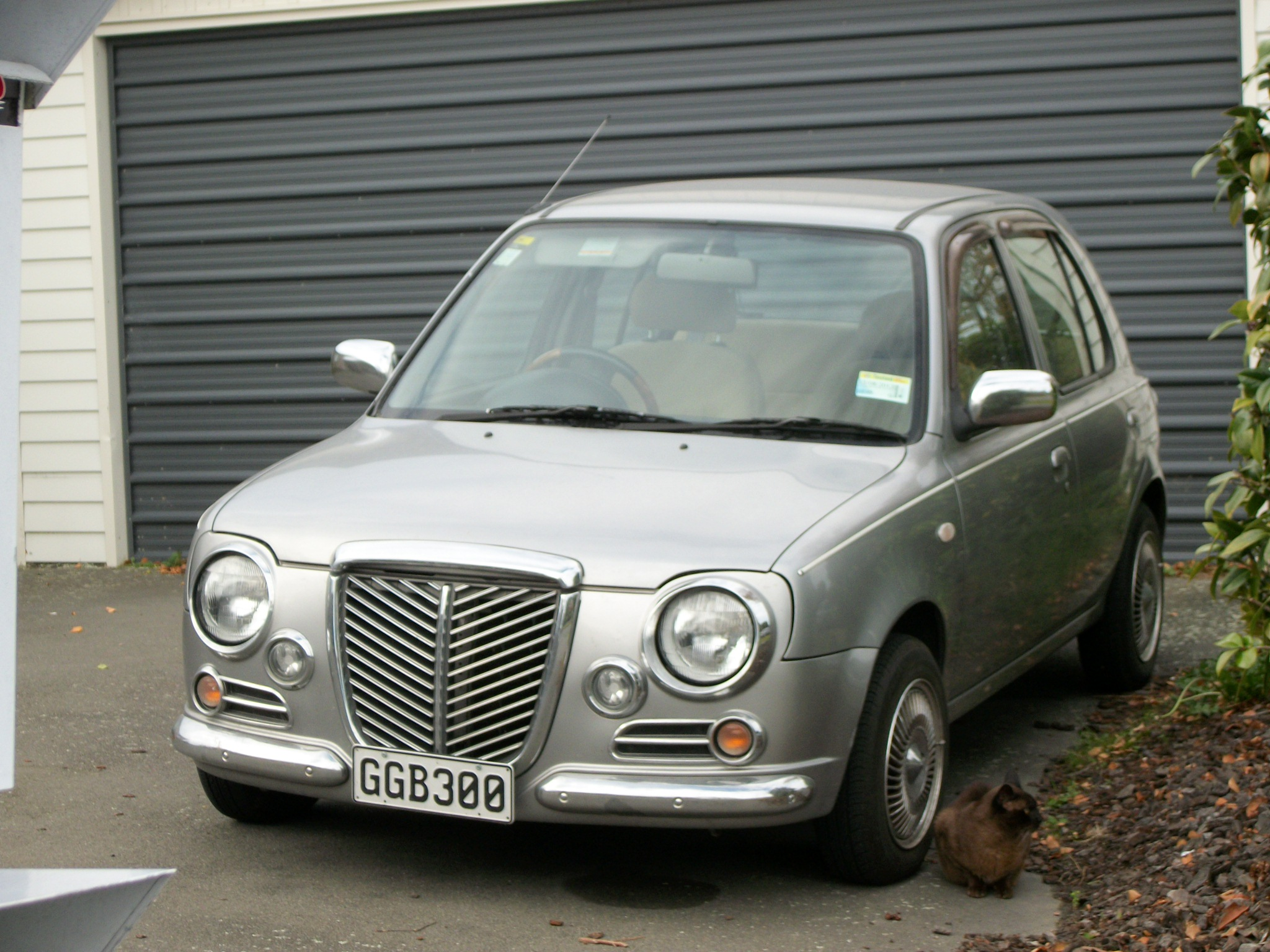
Nissan March Bolero, imported to New Zealand

New Zealand has stringent safety and emission standards. Besides biosecurity and customs clearances, a vehicle must be entry certified by a transport services delivery agent (TSDA) which includes checking that paper data and physical data meet safety, emissions, and fuel consumption standards.

=== Pakistan ===
Pakistan applies strict controls on imports. Imported cars must be not more than three years old. High import taxes are levied on imported vehicles. Special ships are sometimes used for exporting vehicles to Pakistan to meet the rising demand.

=== Russia ===
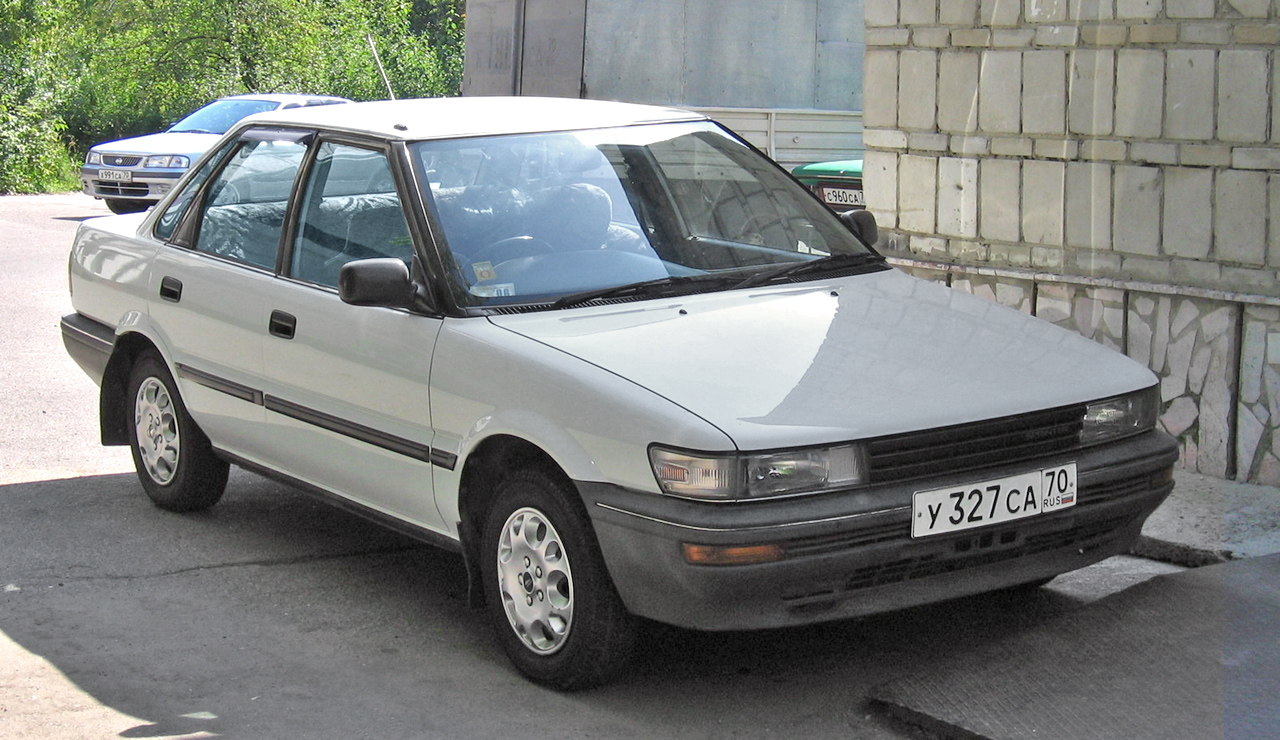
Right hand drive Toyota Sprinter in Seversk

While Russia has right hand traffic, it allows the importation of LHT vehicles if they pass the technical inspection. This is compulsory for all street-legal vehicles in Russia. Although a prohibitively high import tariff is levied on cars more than seven years old, to protect local industry, the oldest Japanese vehicles usually pass the inspection, if they were well maintained. Vehicles imported to Russia are sometimes exported to North Korea and Central Asia.

Due to sanctions placed on Russia in the aftermath of the Russian-Ukrainian War in 2022, they greatly affect used car exports.

=== Saudi Arabia ===
Unlike the UAE, Saudi Arabia does not allow imports of vehicles from Japan or any LHT country because only left hand drive vehicles are allowed. Additionally, right hand drive to left hand drive modifications as well as vehicles from Israel are not allowed due to the laws against Israeli goods.

=== Singapore ===
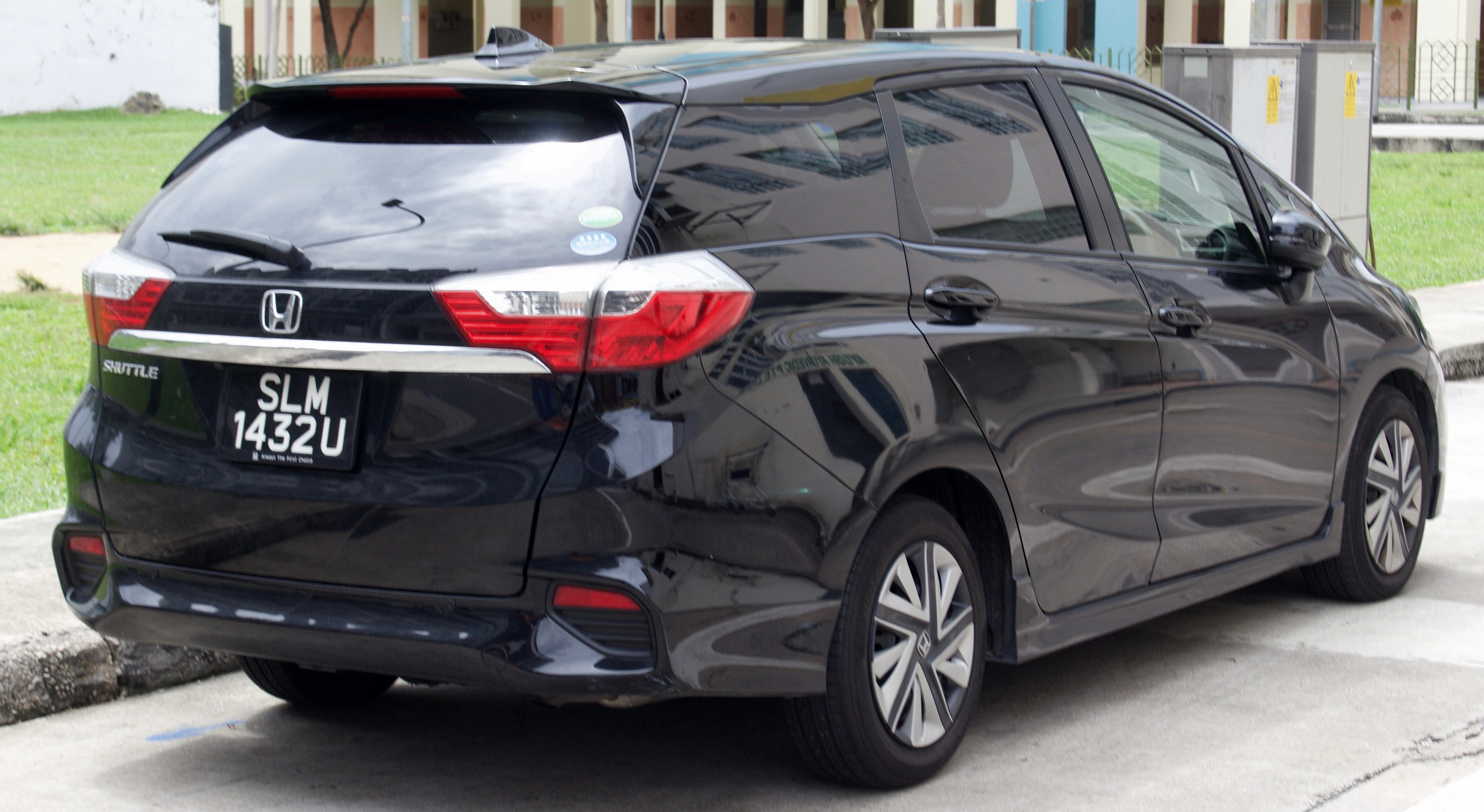
Japanese imported Honda Shuttle

Used Japanese cars that are imported into Singapore must be 3 years old or less.

=== United Arab Emirates ===
Some vehicles like the Toyota Fortuner, Toyota Hiace, and the Nissan Skyline R34 have been imported to the UAE and are sometimes converted to left-hand drive. Importing and exporting right-hand drive vehicles is legal, however right-hand drive vehicles can be only registered if the car age is more than 25 years and only as a "Classic".

=== Ukraine ===
The Verkhovna Rada, in 2006, prohibits imports of used cars that are more than eight years ago, except if they're used for humanitarian purposes. Vehicles have to meet at least Euro 2 emission standards and above.

Bill No. 9238, adopted by the VR on 28 June 2023, is allowing the import of RHD vehicles for military use in order to provide most units with the needed vehicles.

=== United Kingdom ===
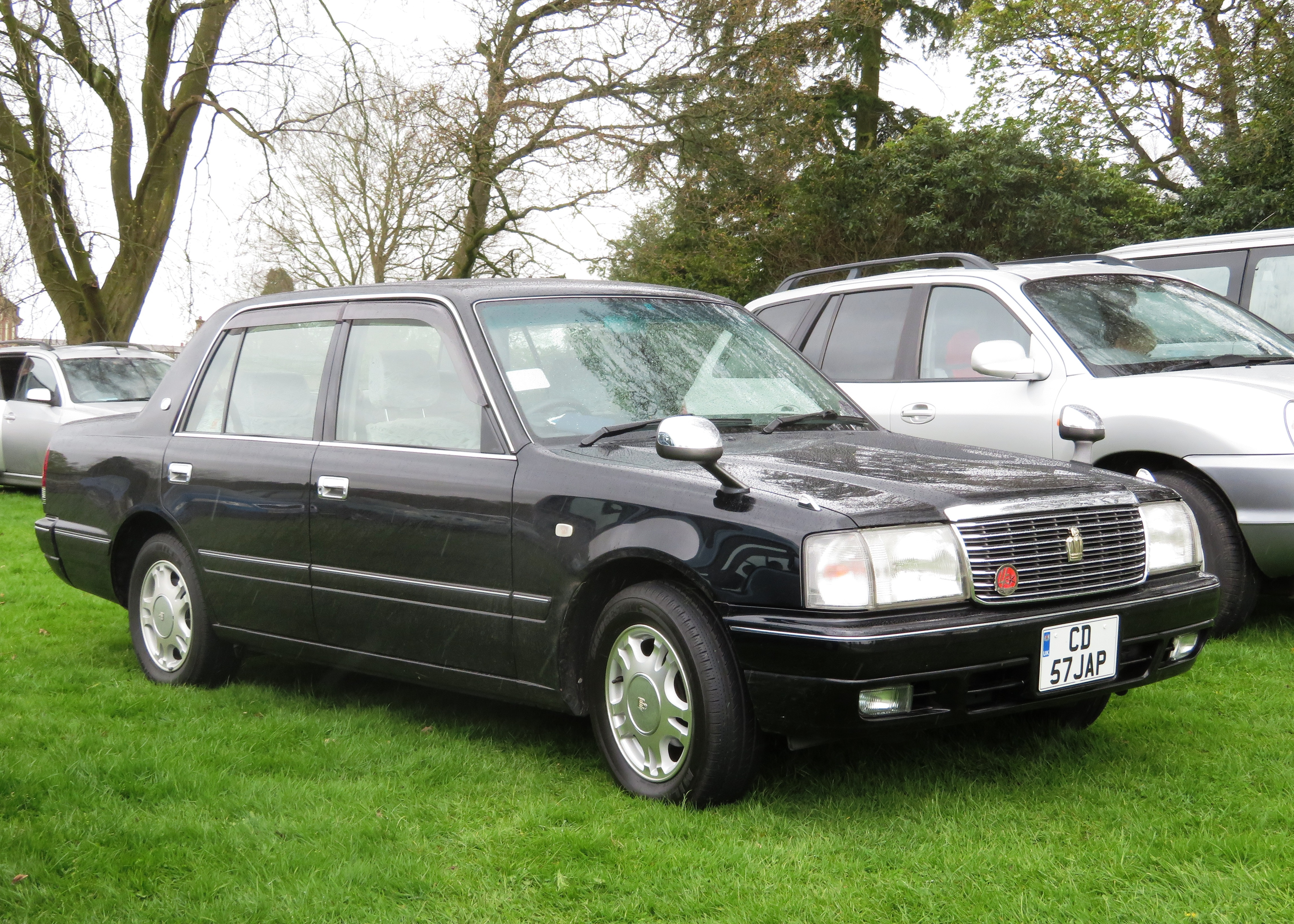
Toyota Comfort, import and registered in the UK

Importing rules for the UK are stringent. Vehicles less than 10 years old must undergo Individual Vehicle Approval to assure compliance with applicable ECE Regulations or British national equivalents. The speedometer must be converted from kilometres per hour to miles per hour, a rear fog light and unleaded-fuel restrictor installed.

Vehicles older than 10 years need only to fit a rear fog light and pass a MOT before applying for V55/5 (First vehicle tax and registration of a used motor vehicle).

=== United States ===
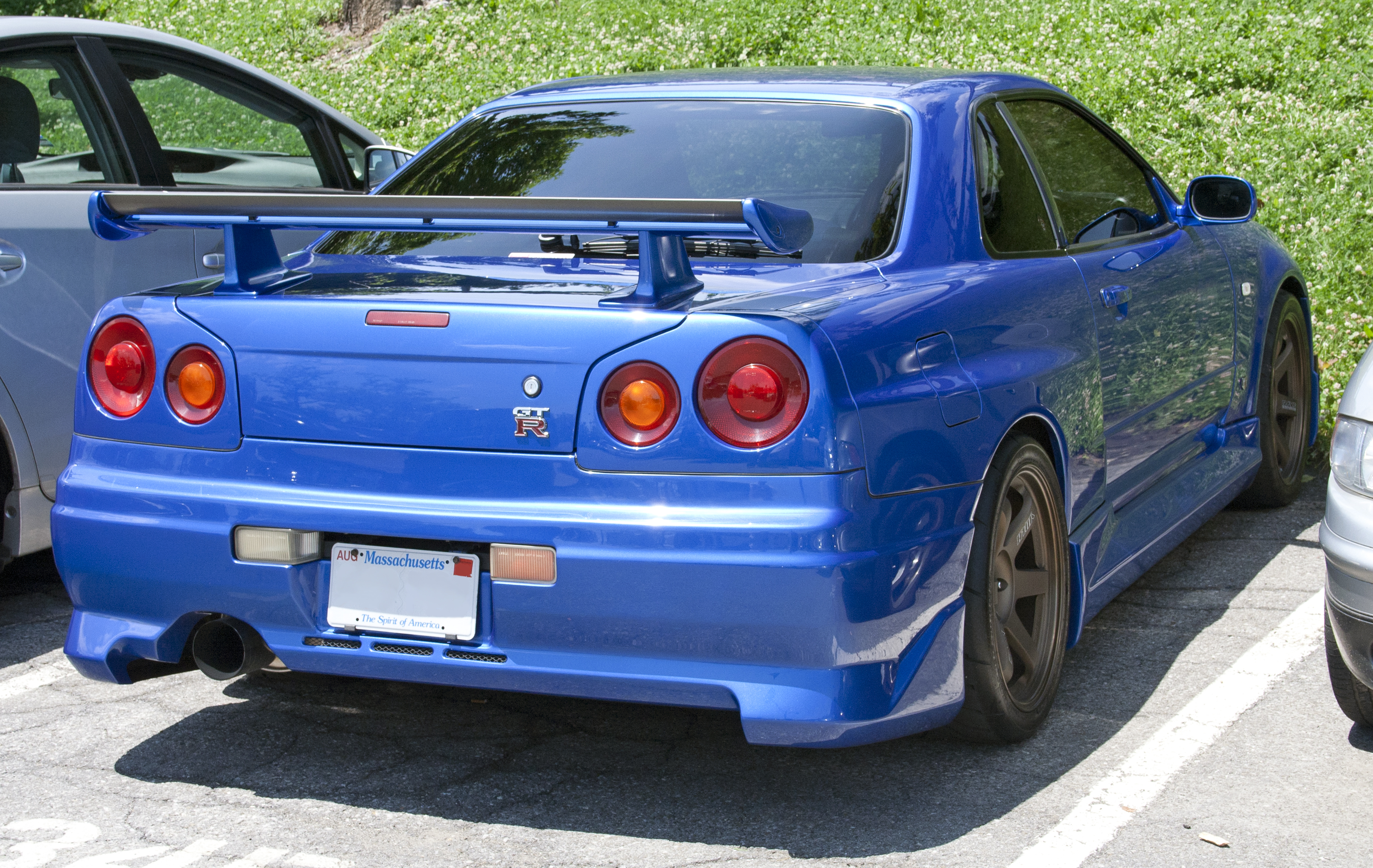
Nissan GT-R R34 in Connecticut

Vehicles at least 25 years old may be imported to the US regardless of non-compliance with that country's Federal Motor Vehicle Safety Standards. Vehicles are registered at the state level in the US, and increasingly stringent sub-national vehicle safety requirements make it difficult to register a Japanese-market vehicle without replacement or modifications to the headlamps and other lights and reflectors, window glass, tires, seat belts and other equipment.

In 21 states, kei trucks less than 25 years old can be legally imported and registered as off-road utility vehicles with on-road usage and top speed restrictions varying by state, although states which allow mini trucks to be operated on public roads prohibit their operation on Interstate highways.

== See also ==
- Japanese Used Motor Vehicle Exporting Association
