= Vehicle registration plates of Japan =

Japan
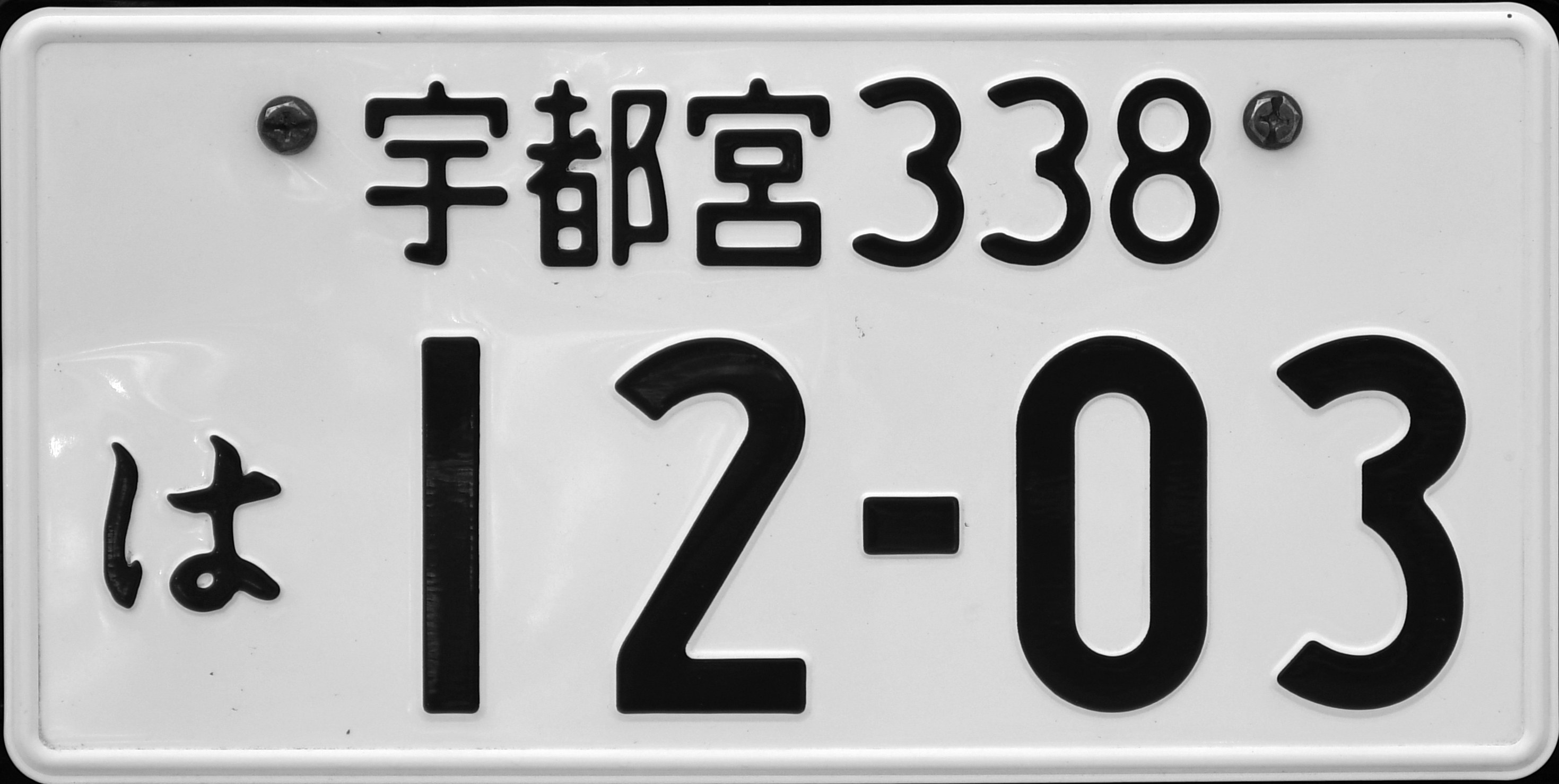
- Country: Japan
- Country code: J

Current series
- Size: 330 mm × 165 mm 13.0 in × 6.5 in
- Serial format: ABC123 DE4(5-67)

In Japan, the national government issues vehicle registration plates for motor vehicles through the Ministry of Land, Infrastructure, Transport and Tourism Land Transportation Offices nationwide. However, the local municipality rather than the national government registers certain vehicles with small engine displacements.

The number on the top line is a vehicle class code which begins with a 0 through 9 to indicate specific vehicle classification. This is signified by the length, width and height of the vehicle as well as engine displacement. Broadly speaking, passenger automobiles with engine displacements at or smaller than 2000 cc receive 5-series plates, while passenger automobiles with engine displacements larger than 2,000 cc (120 cu in) or more receive 3-series license plates.

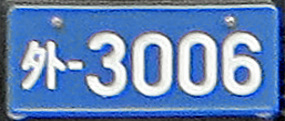
Foreign diplomatic plate with 外

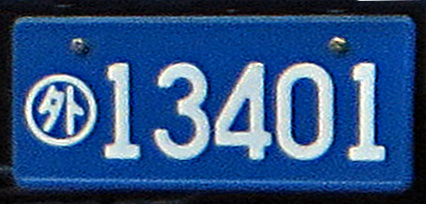
Foreign diplomatic plate with encircled 外

Official vehicles of the Imperial household are exempt from the requirement to display such plates. Official vehicles of the Self-Defense Forces and foreign diplomats are required to display other plates.

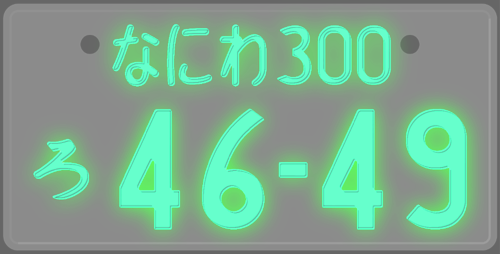
Night image of jikō-shiki (literally "character-glowing type", which means illuminated letters) plate, as might be issued in Osaka

The plates are installed on both the front and rear of the vehicle, with the rear plate permanently attached to the vehicle with a prefecture seal completely covering one of the attaching plate bolts. The plate is only removed when the vehicle is sold secondhand to someone from a different prefecture, has reached the end of service and has been sold for scrap, or exported. New vehicles are not delivered to the purchaser until the plates have been attached at the dealership.

Since November 1, 1970, a "jikō-shiki" (字光式) plate has been offered for private vehicles at the owner's request. The green characters on this type of plate are replaced with molded green plastic that can be illuminated from behind the plate. From May 19, 1998, specific numbers can also be requested if the numbers are not already in use. From 2010, these are also available in blue version of vehicle registration plates started in 1973.

The international vehicle registration code for Japan is J.

== Appearance ==
Ordinary private vehicles have white plates with green text, while commercial vehicles have green plates with white text.

Lightweight private vehicles (kei cars) have yellow plates with black text, while lightweight commercial vehicles have black plates with yellow text.

Private, two-wheeled vehicles with engine displacements exceeding 250 cc have white plates with green text;

commercial two-wheeled vehicles with engine displacements exceeding 2000 cc have green plates with white text.

Private, lightweight two-wheeled vehicles with engine displacements of 250 cc or less have white plates with green text;

commercial, lightweight two-wheeled vehicles with engine displacements of 250 cc or less have green plates with white text.

Class	Engine (cc displacement)	Plate color	Text color	Plate dimensions
Private vehicle	>660	White	Green	Medium or large
Commercial vehicle	>660	Green	White	Medium or large
Lightweight private (kei car)	<660	Yellow	Black	Medium
Lightweight commercial	<660	Black	Yellow	Medium
Microcar	0–49	Sky Blue (Note: These plates are issued by municipal governments.)	Blue	Extra small
Small special vehicle (Note: Various size and other limits apply; mainly for construction or agricultural vehicles.)	no limit	Green	Black	Extra small
2 wheel	0–49	White	Blue	Extra small
2 wheel	50–89	Yellow	Blue	Extra small
2 wheel	90–124	Pink	Blue	Extra small
2 wheel	125–249	White	Green	Small
2 wheel	≥250	White, green border	Green	Small

Large
44 cm × 22 cm (17.3 in × 8.7 in)
(for over 8 tons vehicle, or capacity of 30 people or more)
Medium
33 cm × 16.5 cm (13.0 in × 6.5 in)
Small
23 cm × 12.5 cm (9.1 in × 4.9 in)
Extra small
about 20 cm × 10 cm (7.9 in × 3.9 in)
(differs according to each municipality)

Until December 31, 1974, kei cars had small green and white license plates. After this date, they received medium plates, now in black and yellow to distinguish them from regular cars.

	Private vehicles	Commercial vehicles
Compact or Large vehicles and motorbikes (displacements <250 cm^{3})		
Kei car		
2-wheeled vehicle ≥250 cm^{3}		

The illustration shows what a plate might look like. The top line contains the name of the issuing office (Tama, shown, is in Tokyo) and a vehicle class code. The bottom line contains a hiragana character and a four-digit serial number divided into two groups of two digits separated by a hyphen. Any leading zeroes are replaced by centered dots.

White plates can have the following hiragana (bold indicates rental vehicle characters):

さすせそたちつてとなにぬねのはひふほまみむめもやゆよらりるろ れわ

Green plates can have the following hiragana:

あいうえかきくけこを

Yellow plates can have the following hiragana:

あいうえかきくけこさすせそたちつてとなにぬねのはひふほまみむめもやゆよらりるれろわを

Black plates can have the following hiragana (bold indicates rental vehicle characters):

り れ

Some characters, including ones with a dakuten or a handakuten, cannot be used on any plates, including the yellow and black ones:

ばだがぱざびぢぎぴじぶづぐぷずべでげペぜぼどごぽぞ

In addition, these hiragana cannot be used on any license plates due to various reasons explained below.

おしへゑゐん

The hiragana お is not used because it is too similar to the hiragana あ especially if there is a car crash.

The hiragana し is often thought to represent the kanji 死, which means death so it is not used.

The hiragana へ is often thought to represent the kanji 屁, which means fart so it is not used.

The hiragana ゑ and ゐ are very old and are not used commonly so to avoid confusion they are not used.

The hiragana ん, which is pronounced n, is hard to get across quickly over the phone so it is not used.

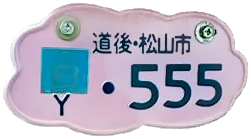
NHK announced in early 2009 that prefectures may now choose their own color scheme and possibly pattern. This is already being done with the motorcycle plates for Matsuyama, Ehime.

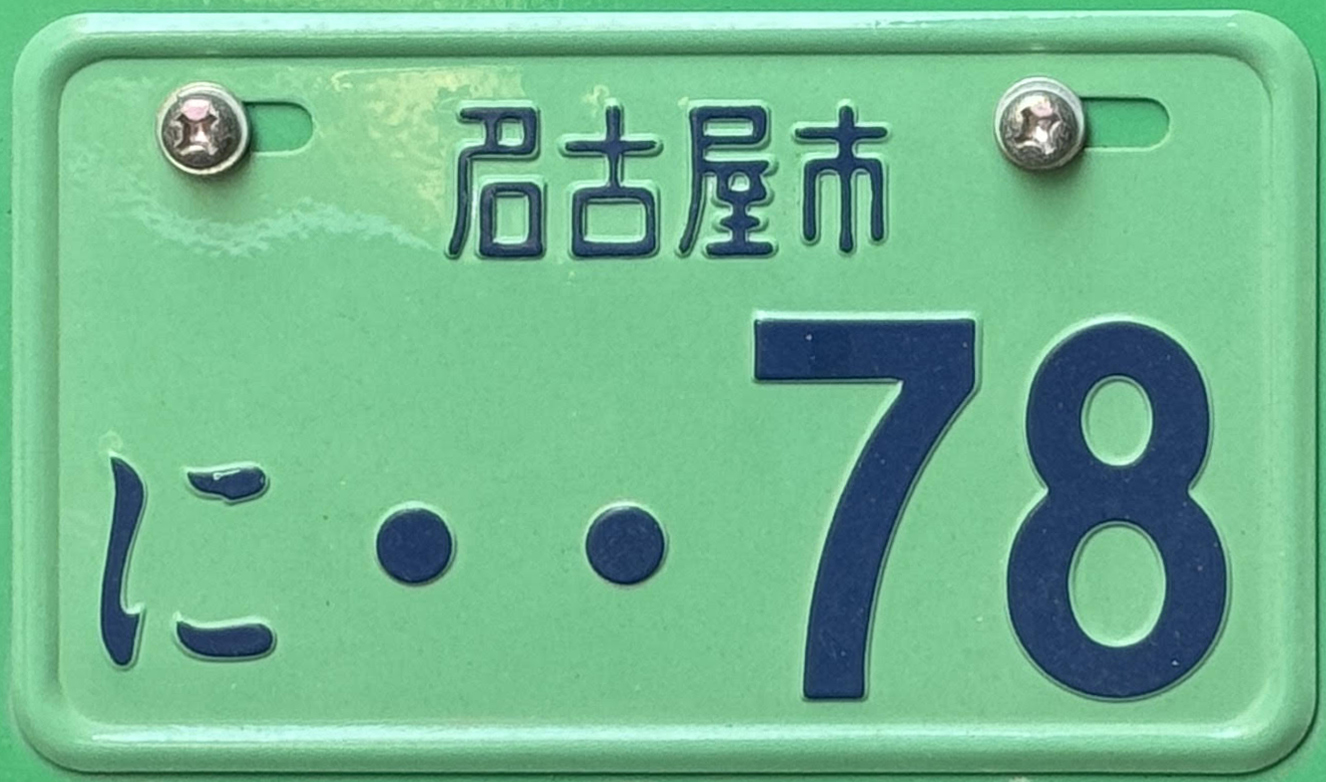
Municipalities issue their own plates for light and low-speed vehicles such as mopeds, agricultural equipment, and small construction vehicles

A license plate in Japan thus follows this format: KK?*H##-## (e.g., 足立500き21-41), where KK is the name of the issuing office in kanji, H is a hiragana, ? is a 5 for vehicles less than 2000 cc and a 3 for vehicles greater than 2000 cc (other numbers are less common—1 for large trucks, 2 for buses, etc.), * is a number from 0 to 99 (pre-1971 license plates will omit this), and # is a number from 0* to 9 (*leading zeroes are replaced by centered dots).

=== Special use plates ===
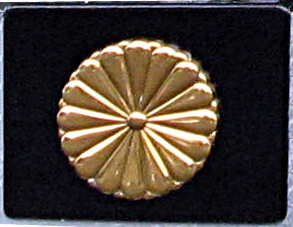
Plate of the Imperial House of Japan only attached when the Emperor himself or the Empress is in the car

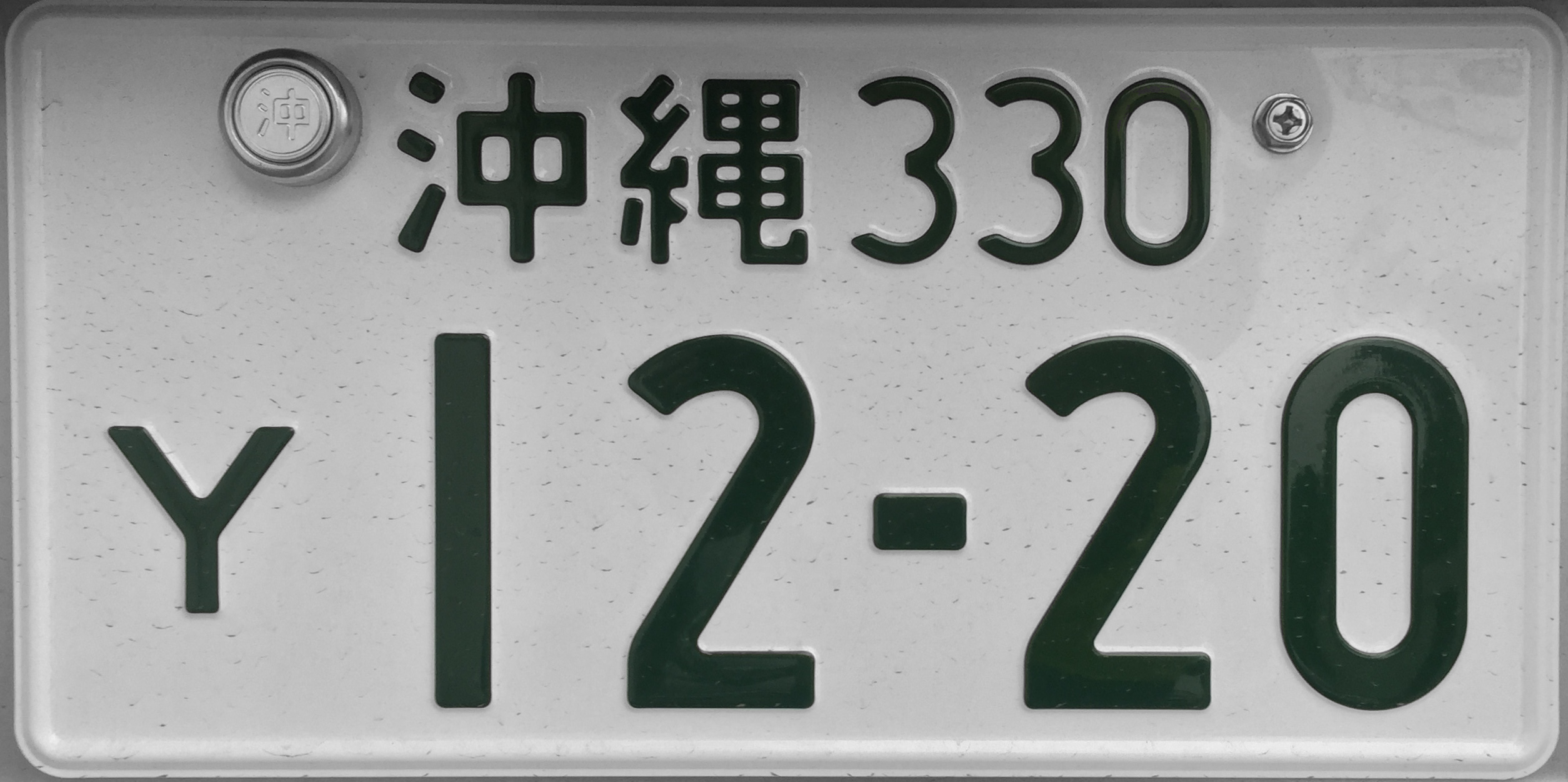
U.S. forces license plate of Okinawa

Vehicles owned by personnel with the United States military in Japan under the Status of Forces Agreement (SOFA) have a "Y" on white plates and an "A" on yellow plates, where the hiragana character is normally displayed. Earlier versions of the SOFA license plate displayed the letters "K", "M", "G", "H" and "E". These letters indicated the car was imported into Japan under SOFA. Today, cars with an "E" indicate that Japanese sales tax has not been paid and the vehicle will not remain in Japan when the military member departs. Since the 1980s, military commands have discouraged servicemembers assigned to Japan from shipping their vehicles from the U.S. into the country, so this is rarely seen. US military and US government members that retire in Japan are no longer under the SOFA and have standard Japanese plates issued.

The official imperial cars have a special number plate with the kanji 皇 and a one-digit number below.

=== Out of country plates ===
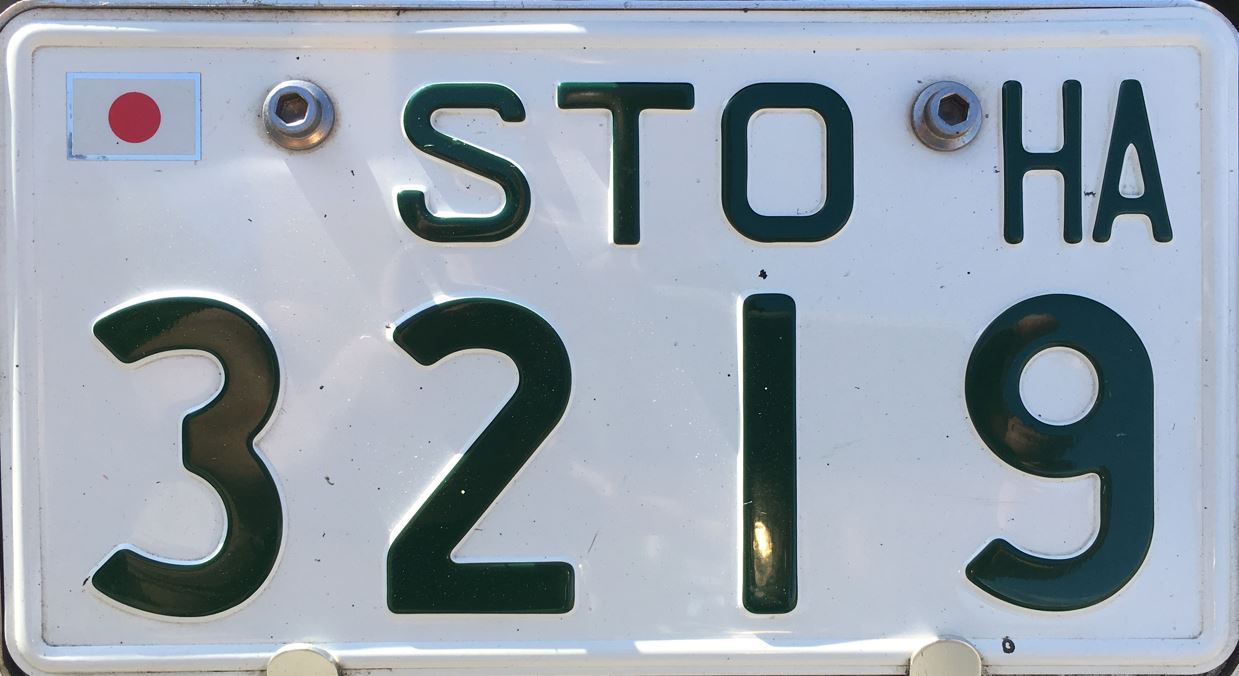
Out of country plate from Saitama Omiya (STO)

Because the Japanese writing system, particularly the kana, is unique to Japan, standard-issue Japanese license plates are considered unacceptable for international travel. If motorists wish to take their vehicles abroad with them, the Ministry of Transport will issue them with plates with the hiragana and kanji scripts replaced by Roman letters. The hiragana prefix is replaced by a Kunrei-shiki romanization of that character. The kanji prefecture/office code is replaced by a two- or three-letter abbreviation, the first two letters representing the prefecture, the third (if present) representing the office within the prefecture. All the numerical portions of the plate remain the same.

Using the example given above, the plate (足立50Kき21-41) would then read TKA 50K KI 21-41 (TKA for Tokyo Adachi).

== Vehicle class code system ==
In addition to plate size and color, Japanese plates since 1962 have identified the vehicle type (signified by length, width and height as well as engine displacement) by use of a vehicle class code signified by a number on the top line of the plate for all vehicles with three or more wheels. The vehicle class code system is not widely understood outside of Japan, and as a result, Japanese vehicles displaying "vanity" Japanese license plates at overseas shows and events are often unwittingly misrepresented.

Motorbikes and other two wheeled vehicles do not use this system.

In 1967, double digit vehicle codes were introduced for the first time, once all previous possible combinations were used. For example, 3 would become 33, and then 34, 35, etc. This began in October 1967 in the more populous prefectures initially for the most common vehicle classes such as 3 and 5. In April 1971 all vehicle codes become double digit across the country. Double digit codes finally stopped being issued in 1999.

By the early 1970s, three-wheeled passenger cars were no longer in production and some prefectures began to issue the double digit codes 77, 78 and 79 as an 'overflow series' for passenger cars 2000cc and under. This practice stopped in 1999.

By May 1998, some prefectures were beginning to run out of all possible combinations of double digit vehicle codes for the most common classes (notably 599 and 799) and began issuing triple digit vehicle codes.

1962-71	1967-99	1998-	Description
1	11, 1x	1xx	Truck that exceeds any of the limitations placed on 4-number vehicle types
2	22, 2x	2xx	Small to medium bus
3	33, 3x	3xx	Passenger car with displacement larger than 2000 cc, or exceeding length and width regulations for compact cars
4	44 through 49	4xx	Truck, van, or other light commercial shorter than 4.7 metres, narrower than 1.7 metres, lower than 2 metres, and (if petrol-engined, no limit for diesel or LPG engines) with displacement not exceeding 2000 cc.
5	55, 5x	5xx	Passenger car with displacement under 2000 cc and shorter than 4.7 metres, narrower than 1.7 metres
6	66, 6x		Three wheeled truck with displacement less than 360cc
7			Three wheeled passenger car
	77, 7x		Passenger car with displacement from 660cc to 2000cc and shorter than 4.7 metres, narrower than 1.7 metres ('overflow' series)
8	88, 8x	800	Special vehicle requiring yearly inspection with displacement greater than 660cc
9	99	900	Tractor or forklift
0	00	000	Construction equipment

== Transportation offices and markings ==
Japanese registration plates indicate the transportation office that issued the plate, known in Japanese as Gotōchi (ご当地; local place). Until 1964, this was indicated with a single kanji character like 沖 for Okinawa. Starting in 1964, the place name is printed in full with up to four characters, for example 沖縄 for Okinawa.

In 2006, several new location names, numbers, were approved by the MLIT for places that wanted to increase their recognition for purposes such as tourism. Criteria included the need for 100,000 vehicles in the area and the avoidance of an imbalance in the prefecture. The new locations began appearing in 2006 on plates for vehicles registered in certain specific cities, towns and villages in or near the places marked below in green.

Since the issuing office is linked to the owner's place of residence, some markings are considered more desirable than others, with Shinagawa in inner Tokyo often considered the best.

Issuing office		Marking			Former markings	Ref
Prefecture	Municipality	Jpn	Transliteration	Intl	Former markings	Ref
Aichi	Komaki	尾張小牧	Owari-Komaki	ACO		
Aichi	Komaki	一宮	Ichinomiya	ACI		
Aichi	Komaki	春日井	Kasugai	ACK		
Aichi	Nagoya	名古屋	Nagoya	ACN	愛 (AC)	
Aichi	Toyohashi	豊橋	Toyohashi	ACT		
Aichi	Toyota	三河	Mikawa	ACM		
Aichi	Toyota	岡崎	Okazaki	ACZ		
Aichi	Toyota	豊田	Toyota	ACY		
Akita	Akita	秋田	Akita	ATA	秋 (AT)	
Aomori	Aomori	青森	Aomori	AMA	青 (AM)	
Aomori	Aomori	弘前	Hirosaki	AMS		
Aomori	Hachinohe	八戸	Hachinohe	AMH		
Chiba	Chiba	千葉	Chiba	CBC	千 (CB)	
Chiba	Chiba	成田	Narita	CBT		
Chiba	Funabashi	習志野	Narashino	CBN		
Chiba	Funabashi	市川	Ichikawa	CBI		
Chiba	Funabashi	船橋	Funabashi	CBF		
Chiba	Noda	野田	Noda	CBD		
Chiba	Noda	柏	Kashiwa	CBK		
Chiba	Noda	松戸	Matsudo	CBM		
Chiba	Sodegaura	袖ヶ浦	Sodegaura	CBS		
Chiba	Sodegaura	市原	Ichihara	CBH		
Ehime	Matsuyama	愛媛	Ehime	EH		
Fukui	Fukui	福井	Fukui	FI		
Fukuoka	Fukuoka	福岡	Fukuoka	FOF	福 (FO)	
Fukuoka	Iizuka	筑豊	Chikuhō	FOC		
Fukuoka	Kitakyushu	北九州	Kitakyūshū	FOK		
Fukuoka	Kurume	久留米	Kurume	FOR		
Fukushima	Fukushima	福島	Fukushima	FS		
Fukushima	Fukushima	会津	Aizu	FSA		
Fukushima	Fukushima	郡山	Kōriyama	FSK		
Fukushima	Fukushima	白河	Shirakawa	FSS		
Fukushima	Iwaki	いわき	Iwaki	FSI		
Gifu	Gifu	岐阜	Gifu	GFG	岐 (GF)	
Gifu	Takayama	飛騨	Hida	GFH		
Gunma	Maebashi	群馬	Gunma	GMG	群 (GM)	
Gunma	Maebashi	前橋	Maebashi	GMM		
Gunma	Maebashi	高崎	Takasaki	GMT		
Hiroshima	Fukuyama	福山	Fukuyama	HSF		
Hiroshima	Hiroshima	広島	Hiroshima	HSH	広 (HS)	
Hokkaidō	Asahikawa	旭川	Asahikawa	AKA	旭 (AK)	
Hokkaidō	Hakodate	函館	Hakodate	HDH	函 (HD)	
Hokkaidō	Kitami	北見	Kitami	KIK	北 (KI)	
Hokkaidō	Kitami	知床	Shiretoko	KRS		
Hokkaidō	Kushiro	釧路	Kushiro	KRK	釧 (KR)	
Hokkaidō	Kushiro	知床	Shiretoko	KRS		
Hokkaidō	Muroran	室蘭	Muroran	MRM	室 (MR)	
Hokkaidō	Muroran	苫小牧	Tomakomai	MRT		
Hokkaidō	Obihiro	帯広	Obihiro	OHO	帯 (OH)	
Hokkaidō	Obihiro	十勝	Tokachi			
Hokkaidō	Sapporo	札幌	Sapporo	SPS	札 (SP)	
Hyōgo	Himeji	姫路	Himeji	HGH		
Hyōgo	Kobe	神戸	Kōbe	HGK	兵 (HG)	
Ibaraki	Mito	水戸	Mito	IGM	茨城 (IGI), 茨 (IG)	
Ibaraki	Tsuchiura	土浦	Tsuchiura	IGT		
Ibaraki	Tsuchiura	つくば	Tsukuba	IGK		
Ishikawa	Kanazawa	石川	Ishikawa	IKI	石 (IK)	
Ishikawa	Kanazawa	金沢	Kanazawa	IKK		
Iwate	Yahaba	岩手	Iwate	ITI	岩 (IT)	
Iwate	Yahaba	平泉	Hiraizumi	ITH		
Iwate	Yahaba	盛岡	Morioka	ITM		
Kagawa	Takamatsu	香川	Kagawa	KAK	香 (KA)	
Kagawa	Takamatsu	高松	Takamatsu	KAT		
Kagoshima	Kagoshima	鹿児島	Kagoshima	KOK	鹿 (KO)	
Kagoshima	Kagoshima	奄美	Amami	KOA		
Kanagawa	Aikawa	相模	Sagami	KNS		
Kanagawa	Hiratsuka	湘南	Shōnan	KNN		
Kanagawa	Kawasaki	川崎	Kawasaki	KNK		
Kanagawa	Yokohama	横浜	Yokohama	KNY	神 (KN)	
Kōchi	Kōchi	高知	Kōchi	KCK	高 (KC)	
Kumamoto	Kumamoto	熊本	Kumamoto	KUK	熊 (KU)	
Kyoto	Kyoto	京都	Kyōto	KTK	京 (KT)	
Mie	Tsu	三重	Mie	MEM	三 (ME)	
Mie	Tsu	鈴鹿	Suzuka	MES		
Mie	Tsu	四日市	Yokkaichi	MEY		
Mie	Tsu	伊勢志摩	Iseshima	MEI		
Miyagi	Sendai	宮城	Miyagi	MGM	宮 (MG)	
Miyagi	Sendai	仙台	Sendai	MGS		
Miyazaki	Miyazaki	宮崎	Miyazaki	MZ		
Nagano	Matsumoto	松本	Matsumoto	NNM		
Nagano	Matsumoto	諏訪	Suwa	NNS		
Nagano	Matsumoto	南信州	Southern Shinshu			
Nagano	Matsumoto	安曇野	Azumino			
Nagano	Nagano	長野	Nagano	NNN	長 (NN)	
Nagasaki	Nagasaki	長崎	Nagasaki	NS		
Nagasaki	Tsushima	長崎	Nagasaki	NS		
Nagasaki	Sasebo	佐世保	Sasebo	NSS		
Nara	Yamatokōriyama	奈良	Nara	NRN	奈 (NR)	
Nara	Yamatokōriyama	飛鳥	Asuka	NRA		
Niigata	Nagaoka	長岡	Nagaoka	NGO		
Niigata	Nagaoka	上越	Joetsu	NGJ		
Niigata	Niigata	新潟	Niigata	NGN	新 (NG)	
Ōita	Ōita	大分	Ōita	OT		
Okayama	Okayama	岡山	Okayama	OYO	岡 (OY)	
Okayama	Okayama	倉敷	Kurashiki	OYK		
Okinawa	Ishigaki	沖縄	Okinawa	ONO	沖 (ON)	
Okinawa	Miyakojima	沖縄	Okinawa	ONO	沖 (ON)	
Okinawa	Urasoe	沖縄	Okinawa	ONO	沖 (ON)	
Osaka	Izumi	和泉	Izumi	OSZ	泉 (OSI)	
Osaka	Izumi	堺	Sakai	OSS		
Osaka	Neyagawa	大阪	Ōsaka	OSO	大 (OS)	
Osaka	Osaka	なにわ	Naniwa	OSN		
Saga	Saga	佐賀	Saga	SAS	佐 (SA)	
Saitama	Kasukabe	春日部	Kasukabe	STB		
Saitama	Kasukabe	越谷	Koshigaya	STY		
Saitama	Kumagaya	熊谷	Kumagaya	STK		
Saitama	Saitama	大宮	Ōmiya	STO	埼玉 (STS), 埼 (ST)	
Saitama	Saitama	川口	Kawaguchi	STW		
Saitama	Tokorozawa	所沢	Tokorozawa	STT		
Saitama	Tokorozawa	川越	Kawagoe	STG		
Shiga	Moriyama	滋賀	Shiga	SIS	滋 (SI)	
Shimane	Shimane	島根	Shimane	SN	嶋 (SM)	
Shimane	Shimane	出雲	Izumo	SNI		
Shizuoka	Hamamatsu	浜松	Hamamatsu	SZH		
Shizuoka	Numazu	沼津	Numazu	SZN		
Shizuoka	Numazu	富士山	Fujisan	SZF		
Shizuoka	Numazu	伊豆	Izu	SZI		
Shizuoka	Shizuoka	静岡	Shizuoka	SZS	静 (SZ)	
Tochigi	Sano	とちぎ	Tochigi	TCK		
Tochigi	Utsunomiya	宇都宮	Utsunomiya	TGU	栃木 (TGT), 栃 (TG)	
Tochigi	Utsunomiya	那須	Nasu	TGN		
Tochigi	Utsunomiya	日光	Nikkō			
Tokushima	Tokushima	徳島	Tokushima	TST	徳 (TS)	
Tokyo	Adachi	足立	Adachi	TKA	足 (TOA)	
Tokyo	Adachi	江東	Koto	TKK		
Tokyo	Adachi	葛飾	Katsushika	TKU		
Tokyo	Adachi	江戸川	Edogawa			
Tokyo	Hachiōji	八王子	Hachiōji	TKH		
Tokyo	Kunitachi	多摩	Tama	TKT	多 (TOT)	
Tokyo	Nerima	練馬	Nerima	TKN	練 (TON)	
Tokyo	Nerima	杉並	Suginami	TKM		
Tokyo	Nerima	板橋	Itabashi	TKI		
Tokyo	Shinagawa	品川	Shinagawa, Ogasawara	TKS	品 (TOS)	
Tokyo	Shinagawa	世田谷	Setagaya	TKG		
Tottori	Tottori	鳥取	Tottori	TTT	鳥 (TT)	
Toyama	Toyama	富山	Toyama	TYT	富 (TY)	
Wakayama	Wakayama	和歌山	Wakayama	WKW	和 (WK)	
Yamagata	Mikawa	庄内	Shōnai	YAS		
Yamagata	Yamagata	山形	Yamagata	YA		
Yamaguchi	Yamaguchi	山口	Yamaguchi	YUY	山 (YU)	
Yamaguchi	Yamaguchi	下関	Shimonoseki	YUS		
Yamanashi	Fuefuki	山梨	Yamanashi	YN		
Yamanashi	Fuefuki	富士山	Fujisan	YNF		

== See also ==
- Keicar
- Motor-vehicle inspection (Japan)
