= Tata Super Ace =

Mini truck

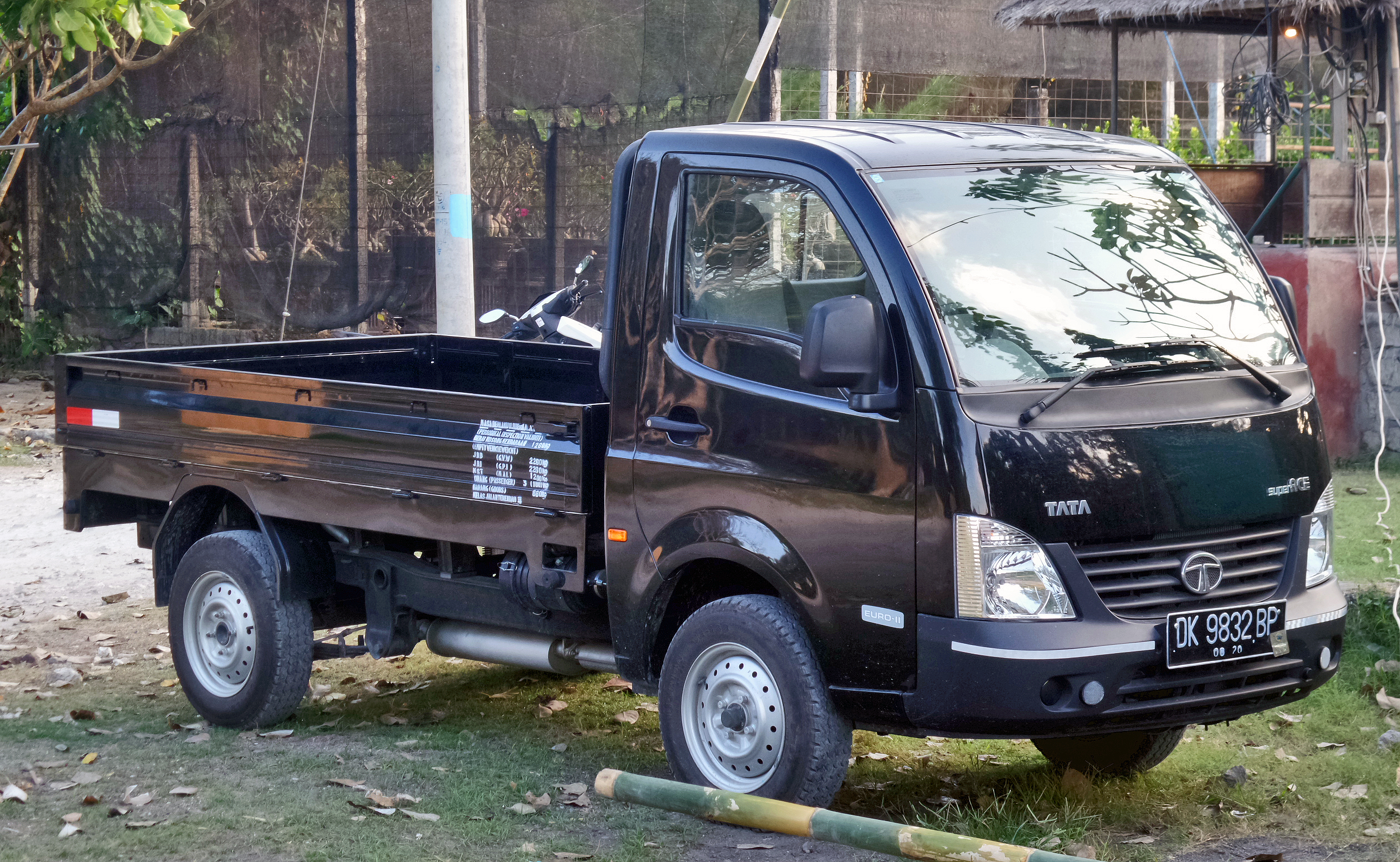

Overview
- Manufacturer: Tata Motors
- Production: 2009–present(Worldwide) 2009–2019(India)
- Assembly: Pantnagar, Uttarakhand, India

Body and chassis
- Class: Mini truck
- Body style: Pickup truck
- Related: Tata Venture

Powertrain
- Engine: 1405 cc Common rail TD 12-valve I4
- Transmission: 5-speed manual

Dimensions
- Wheelbase: 2380 mm
- Length: 4340 mm
- Width: 1565 mm
- Height: 1858 mm
- Curb weight: 1260 kg

Tata Super Ace, launched by the Indian multinational automotive company Tata Motors Limited is a 1 tonne streamlined diesel mini truck. It offers a loading deck length of 2630 mm, a top speed of 125 km/h (78 mph), and a turning radius of 5.1 m. It is based on the design of the highly successful and acclaimed Tata Ace, India's first commercial sub one-tonne, four-wheeled mini truck.

== Features ==
The driver cabin offers car-like interiors along with a host of other creature comforts for the driver like* :

- HVAC function
- Sliding Reclining seats with adjustable Headrest and Folding arrangement
- Power Windows
- Lockable Glovebox
- Hydraulic Power Steering
- Digital Clock
- 12 V power socket for Cigarette lighter and Mobile Charging points
- Lockable Fuel Cap
- Remote Central Locking
- Battery Guard
- Fog Lamps
- Headlamp Levelling

Currently, a Tata 475 TCIC (BSIII) IDI engine is being used for the domestic demand while the export variants come with the existing EURO compliance. This 1405-cc single overhead cam inline-four engine has three valves per cylinder and gives a maximum power of 70 hp (51 kW) at 4500 rpm and a maximum torque of 135.3 N⋅m (100 lb⋅ft) at 2500 rpm.

A Direct Injection Common Rail DICOR engine for Super Ace has been developed and displayed. Production using this engine has already started. It offers an even better fuel economy and engine performance.

== Safety ==
Complying with the International Safety norms, the Super Ace features:

- Collapsible Steering Column
- Broader ORVM for 3 Lane Visibility
- Load Conscious Reducing Valve for better braking at variable loads
- Semi Monocoque Structure with multiple crumple zones
- Side Impact Beams

ASEAN NCAP test results Tata Super Ace (2018)
Test	Points
Overall:	0 /5 stars
Adult occupant:	19.15
Child occupant:	NA
Safety assist:	0.00

== Specification ==
- Engine: Tata 475 TCIC (BSIII)
- Engine capacity: 1396 cc
- Max engine output: 70 hp @ 4000 rpm
- Max engine torque: 13.8 kg⋅m @ 2500 rpm
- Fuel tank capacity: 38 L
- Clutch and transmission: Clutch - Single plate dry friction diaphragm type
- Gearbox: Synchromesh 5+1
- Steering: Power assisted hydraulic Rack & pinion
- Suspension
  - Front: MacPherson strut with anti roll bar
  - Rear: Leaf Spring with Telescopic Shock absorber
- Brakes
  - Front: "Hydraulic dual circuit, vacuum assisted, automatic wear adjuster Disc brake"
  - Rear: Drum Brakes
- Wheels & Tyres Tyres: 165 R14 & 175 LT 8PR
- Dimensions
  - Wheelbase: 2380 mm
  - Width: 1565 mm
  - Length: 4340 mm
  - Height: 1858 mm
  - Front track: 1340 mm
  - Rear track: 1320 mm
  - Ground clearance: 170 mm
- Load body dimensions: 2630 mm × 1460 mm × 300 mm
- Turning Circle Radius: 5.10 m
- Weights: GVW 2180 kg
  - Curb weight: 1180 kg
- Performance
  - Gradability: 39%
  - Top speed: 125 km/h

== International Market ==
=== South Africa ===
Tata Super Ace was launched in South Africa on 19 October 2012 creating a stir in the market previously enjoyed by the likes of Hyundai H100, Daihatsu Gran Max and Kia K2700.

=== Thailand ===
Tata Motors Thailand introduced its new 1-tonne commercial vehicle, the Tata Super ACE City Giant at the 27th Thailand International Motor Expo 2010. The product claims a 24 Hours non-stop operational capacity.

=== Indonesia ===
The company also started exporting the Super Ace to Indonesia in 2013.

=== Sri Lanka ===
DIMO Lanka is the dealer in Sri Lanka.

== Super Ace LHD ==
Tata Motors displayed the Tata Super Ace - EURO V LHD (Left Hand Drive) version at the 11th Auto Expo in New Delhi in 2012 for developed markets. A 1.4L DICOR (Direct Injection Common Rail) engine, coupled with a 5-speed fully synchromesh gearbox powers this Super Ace.

It comes with additional safety and security features like ABS, Airbags and Immobiliser facility.

== Tata Super Ace EV ==
The Electric powertrain version of Super Ace is expected anytime soon as there are unconfirmed reports that Tata Motors is busy building this for developed markets. Super Ace EV was first displayed at the Auto Expo in Delhi, 2012 as part of the Technology Day organized by SIAM.

== Passenger variant ==
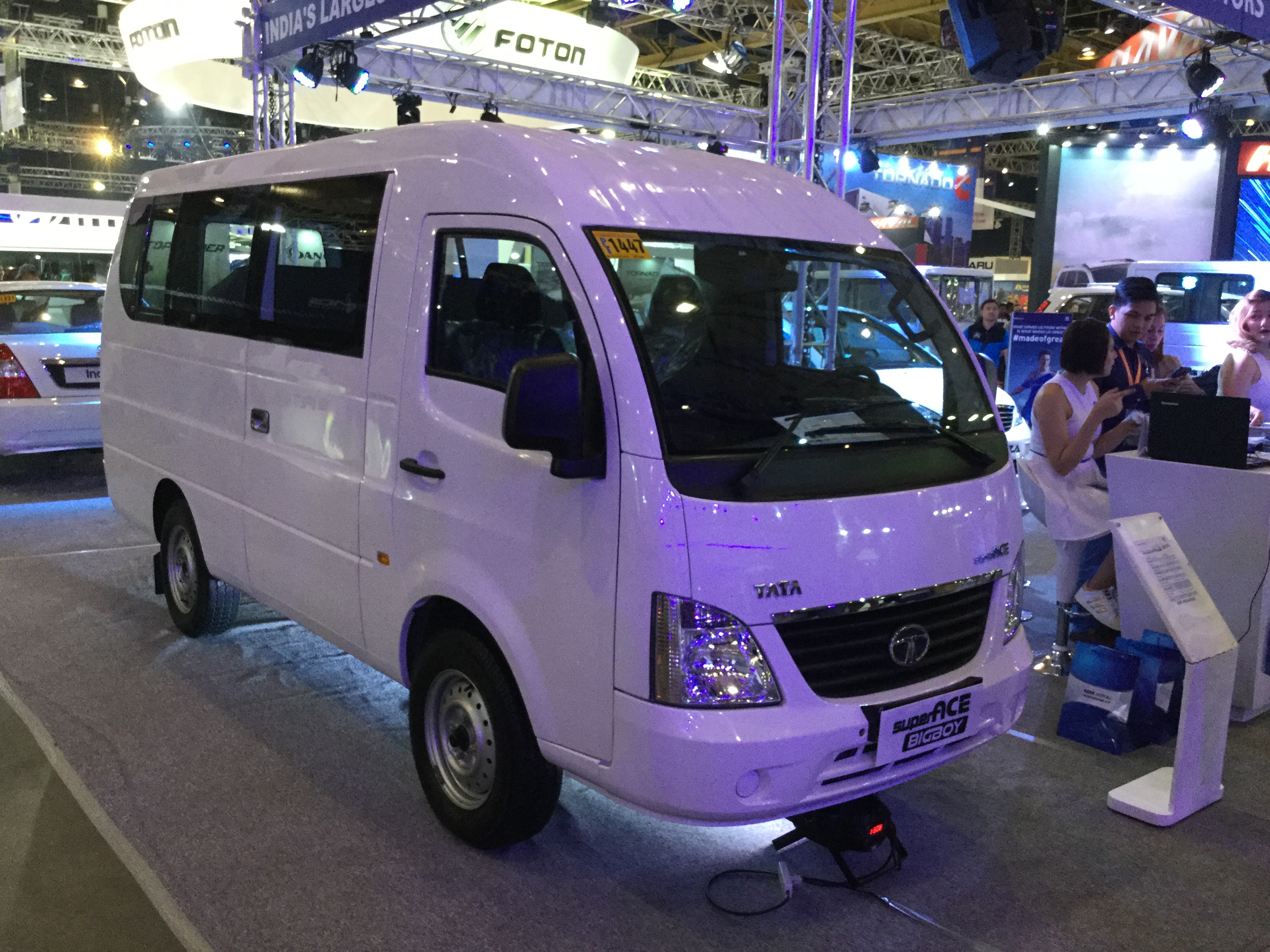
The Tata Super Ace on display at the 2017 MIAS show.

The Super Ace Bigboy is the passenger version of the Super Ace and was displayed at the 2017 MIAS show.
