= National Car Test =

Roadworthiness test in Ireland

- Native name: An Tástáil Náisiúnta Gluaisteán
- Type: Roadworthiness test
- Founded: 4 January 2000; 26 years ago
- Founder: National Car Testing Service, Road Safety Authority
- Headquarters: Citywest Business Campus, Dublin, Ireland
- Area served: Ireland
- Website: www.ncts.ie

The National Car Test (Irish: An Tástáil Náisiúnta Gluaisteán; abbreviated NCT) is a roadworthiness test, which all cars in Ireland must undergo. Following a tender process, the Road Safety Authority awarded the National Car Testing Service contract for the operation of the vehicle inspection service in the Republic of Ireland to Applus.

== History ==
The National Car Test (the NCT) was introduced on 4 January 2000, since then all cars four years and older must undergo an NCT. The NCT due date is calculated by reference to the date of first registration of the car, with tests due every two years for cars younger than 10 years. The 2024 annual report of the National Car Testing Service stated that:

Periodic roadworthiness testing of passenger cars and commercial vehicles is mandatory in all Member States of the European Union, in accordance with Directive 2014/45/EU. The NCTS was introduced in Ireland in January 2000 as part of the EU Directive that makes car testing compulsory in all member states. It is aimed primarily at improving road safety and enhancing environmental protection by providing an independent assessment of the roadworthiness and emissions level of vehicles at regular intervals throughout their life.

Cars on Stephen Street in Sligo

Annual Testing was introduced in June 2011 and is now a legal requirement for vehicles that present for their 10th anniversary test and each subsequent test. Vehicles can be inspected up to 90 days in advance of the anniversary of the registration date. The waiting lists have proven to be long, with even the 'priority list' taking in excess of a month.

=== Previous roadworthiness tests ===
In its 1982 annual report, Córas Iompair Éireann noted that in response to legislation "making it compulsory for certain categories of road vehicles to have Certificates of Roadworthiness", the organisation had established eight 'Vehicle Testing Stations' at key locations throughout Ireland.

== Procedure ==
The NCT is available in 47 centres around the Republic of Ireland and it tests various aspects of cars for safety, including tyres, brakes and shock absorbers. It also tests the exhaust fumes for compliance with EU emissions standards. Other safety features, such as the spare tyre, seat belts and lights are also checked.

== Booking and cancellations ==
Due to significant testing backlogs reported since 2022, obtaining a timely appointment has become a challenge for many motorists. While the official NCTS website allows for manual booking, the high demand for cancellation slots has led to the emergence of automated notification services.

As of 2025, the fee for the NCT is €60 for a full test, and €40 for a re-test that requires testing equipment (e.g. emission levels, aiming of headlights, etc.). Re-tests that do not require the use of test equipment (such as obscured registration plate, faulty windscreen wiper, etc.) are free of charge. However, if a confirmed appointment is cancelled with less than five working days' notice (Mon. - Fri., not including the day of the test or the day you contact NCTS), or failure to show up for the test, a €24.00 surcharge will be applied when the car is next brought in for testing. A similar surcharge of €16 will apply in the case of a re-test.

Upon successful completion of the test a valid NCT certificate is issued and this must be displayed on the front windscreen of the vehicle. A driver without a valid NCT on their car will incur three penalty points and a fine of €60, if paid within the first 28 days, and €90 if paid within the following 28 days. Thereafter, if the fine is not paid, a court appearance becomes mandatory and if convicted, five penalty points and a fine will be imposed by the court. This system was introduced on 8 December 2014, whereas previously all offenders were immediately faced with a mandatory court appearance and five penalty points upon conviction, in addition to a fine. Enforcement is the responsibility of the Garda Síochána. Local authorities can (in theory) refuse to issue a tax disc to a vehicle not having an NCT certificate and insurance companies could (in theory) declare cover for an untested (or failed) vehicle invalid.

There are exemptions for certain categories of vehicles such as vintage cars (registered before 1980) and vehicles based permanently on some offshore Islands.

NCTS centres are run by Applus Car Testing Services, who are independent of the motor industry.

If applicants cannot get an NCT appointment within 28 days of applying for it, the test is undertaken free of charge. This is assuming that the applicant:

1. Has not declined another appointment more than twice at a centre of their choosing.
2. Has not previously accepted a booking outside of the 4 week period.

== Statistics ==
In August 2017 the Irish Sunday Independent reported that the best performing car in 2016 tests was the Nissan Juke and the worst the Hyundai Trajet. The same article revealed the existence of a data visualisation of 2016 NCT results.

== Similar tests ==
In Northern Ireland, motor vehicles are subject to the MOT test, which is the standard in the United Kingdom.

== See also ==
- Vehicle inspection (general overview of roadworthiness tests around the world)
- MOT test (UK)
- Shaken (Japan)
- Warrant of Fitness (New Zealand)
