= Tata Venture =

Cabover multi-purpose vehicle

Overview
- Manufacturer: Tata Motors
- Production: 2010–2017
- Assembly: Pune, India; Uttarakhand, India; Shah Alam, Selangor, Malaysia

Body and chassis
- Class: Large MPV
- Body style: 3-door MPV; 4-door MPV
- Layout: RR layout
- Related: Tata Super Ace

Powertrain
- Engine: 1.4 L diesel 70 hp (52 kW)

The Tata Venture is a 3/4-door, 5- to 8-seater cabover full-size minivan (MPV) unveiled on 5 January 2010 at the 10th AutoExpo in Pragati Maidan by Tata Motors in India. It is in competition with the prevalent minivans and vans from Maruti, Mahindra, Toyota, Chevrolet and Force Motors. Venture is powered by a 1.4-litre turbo diesel engine delivering 70 hp (52 kW) power, it is available in 5-, 6-, 7- and 8-seater arrangement. It comes with features such as dual heating, ventilation and air-conditioning (HVAC), reverse parking sensor, power windows, keyless entry and power steering.

== Tata Venture in India ==
On 6 January 2011, Tata Motors launched its awaited passenger vehicle Tata Venture in the Indian automobile market. In India, Tata Venture is available in three variants and all of its variants are equipped with 1.4-litre, 1405 cc Turbocharged diesel engine. The 1.4 L, Turbocharged diesel engine with 5-speed manual transmission gearbox delivers maximum power of 71 PS at 4500 rpm with 135 Nm of maximum torque at 2500 rpm. The all-new minivan Tata Venture is launched with a price tag of Rs 405,000 to Rs 507,000 (ex-showroom, Jaipur).

The Tata Venture is affixed with power steering and power windows, keyless entry, reverse parking aid along with engine immobiliser and the rear wipers too. The car comes in five-, six-, seven- and eight-seater options divided in three-row front-facing configuration. The new car comes in five bright colour options.

The new car Tata Venture is a minivan, it also has a cabover design, and can accommodate eight passengers easily. The minivan is loaded with 1.4-litre turbo diesel powertrain which offers excellent fuel efficiency among the ones available in the domestic auto market. The new minivan offers a mileage of 15.42 km/l, certified by ARAI.Top speed is 125 km/h.

Tata Venture models in India

Tata Venture Five Seater	This is the base variant of Tata Venture that comes with the seating capacity of five passengers and some standard features like power steering, power windows.
Tata Venture Seven Seater	It comes with the seating capacity of seven passengers and with similar features of base variants. It comes with three rows front facing seats.
Tata Venture Eight Seater	It comes with the seating capacity of eight passengers and with similar features of base variants. It comes with three rows front facing seats. It would be available as commercial vehicle.
