= Motor-vehicle inspection (Japan) =

Japanese vehicle inspection program

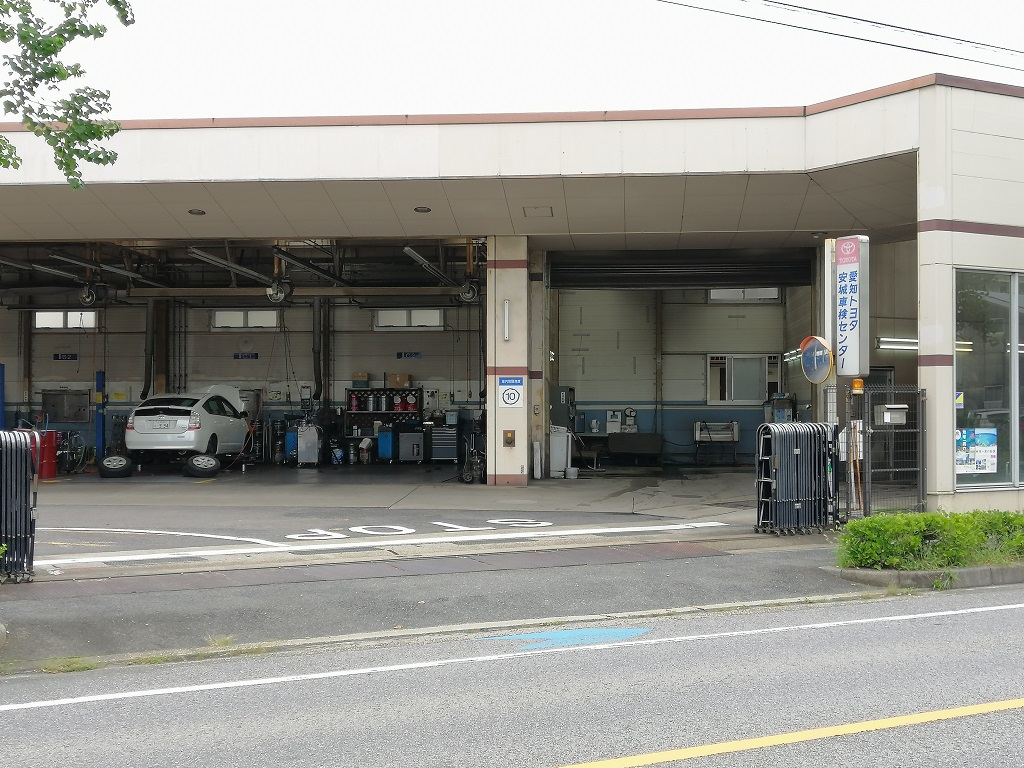
Aichi Toyota Anjo Shaken center (2021)

Shaken (車検), a contraction of Jidōsha Kensa Tōrokuseido (自動車検査登録制度, "automobile inspection registration system"), is the name of the vehicle inspection program in Japan for motor vehicles over 250 cc in engine displacement.

== Reason for existence ==
Officially, the inspection system is in place to ensure that vehicles on Japanese roads are properly maintained and are safe to be on the road. Another reason is to determine if a vehicle has been illegally modified. Illegally modified vehicles and vehicles deemed unsafe will have a red sticker with yellow print reading "illegal vehicle" (不正改造車, fuseikaizousha) and the date the vehicle was declared not fit to be on the street.

== Registration and cost ==
The registration and inspection process may be performed by the owner of the vehicle, though it is most commonly contracted to a professional mechanic or a dealership. The cost for the shaken is broken up as follows:

- Paperwork fee
- Inspection fee
- Compulsory vehicle insurance
- Vehicle weight tax

For a new registration, there are also additional fees for registration and number plates.

A typical third-party shaken for a small or normal sized passenger vehicle costs between ¥100,000 (US$806) and ¥200,000 (US$1,612). However, these prices often include large service fees so the cost of a self-performed "user" shaken is much lower, although exact prices are dependent on the size, weight and age of the vehicle.

== Renewal periods ==
An initial inspection occurs at the vehicle's first registration, and renewal inspections must then take place at prescribed intervals thereafter.

Type of Vehicle		Valid Term	
Type of Vehicle		First inspection	From the 2nd inspection
Trucks	over 8 tons	1 year	1 year
Trucks	under 8 tons	2 years	1 year
Buses/Taxis		1 year	1 year
Rental passenger vehicles		2 years	1 year
Large-sized Special Motor Vehicles "Kei" rental vehicles		2 years	2 years
Regular Passenger Vehicles (10 or fewer passengers) "Kei" Passenger Vehicles; Kei trucks Motorcycles		3 years	2 years

Vehicles with an engine displacement of 250 cc (15 cu in) or less are exempt and therefore not required to undergo an inspection.

== Testing process ==
The process of the shaken involves these steps:

1. An exterior inspection to ensure the vehicle meets Japanese exterior regulations and does not have illegal exterior modifications such as extreme body kits that increase the exterior dimensions.
2. A wheel alignment inspection to ensure the vehicle has its wheels in-line and can turn correctly.
3. A speedometer inspection to ensure the vehicle's speedometer is accurate.
4. A headlamp inspection to ensure that the vehicle's headlights are correctly placed and aligned.
5. A brake inspection to ensure the brakes work correctly.
6. An exhaust gas/muffler inspection, which includes testing carbon monoxide and hydrocarbon emissions along with exhaust noise levels.
7. An undercarriage inspection, which includes looking at suspension parts.

Should a car not meet any of the tests, it will have to be repaired and retested before passing.

== Requirements ==
=== Exterior ===
- Tailpipes: Tailpipes are not allowed to protrude past the car's body, however tailpipes that are built into the side of the vehicle are allowed.
- Body kits/Aero parts: Aerodynamic mirrors, windage trays under the tail section of the car and body kits using front bumper scoops are allowed. However, all aerodynamic parts must fit and be molded correctly so they are flush with the car's body.
- Fenders and overfenders: All fenders and overfenders (including widebody style-kits) must not inhibit the turning of the car's wheels (which must be able to turn 30 degrees inward and 50 degrees outward).
- Spoilers: All spoilers (aftermarket or original equipment manufacturer) must not be wider than the car's rear and must be bolted to the car's trunk.
- Lamps and reflectors: Front, side, and rear turn signals; brake lights, front and rear position lights, hazard warning lights, rear reflectors, low and high beam headlamps are all required. Sidemarker reflectors and lights and fog and driving lamps are permitted. All devices must function correctly and emit or reflect the required colours of light.
- Windows: No tint can be present on driver and passenger side windows, however commercial UV window blocker is allowed. Lexan windows are not allowed unless they are approved via a case by case basis. Stickers/banners on the front windshield and rear glass are not allowed. Etching on the windows, except for vehicle identification number information, is not allowed.

=== Speedometer ===
The speedometer of the car is tested by driving on a dynamometer. The vehicle will be accelerated to 40 km/h twice and the vehicle's speedometer reading is recorded. If the reading is different, it will not pass.

=== Headlamps ===
All headlamps must be an approved type, designed for left-hand traffic, emit white or yellow light, and be aimed correctly. Kei cars built 2006 and older are allowed white or yellow headlights, while kei cars built 2007 and newer are only allowed to have white headlights. Incorrect headlight colour, depending on the person's knowledge during the inspection, will result in a fail.

=== Exhaust and Emissions ===
Cars under 10 years old may emit not more than 1% carbon monoxide, and not more than 300ppm unburned hydrocarbons. Cars older than 10 years may emit up to 4.5% carbon monoxide and up to 1200ppm unburned hydrocarbons. This emission standard is laid out in the Japanese Emission Standard legislation. High flow catalytic converters are allowed. All oxygen sensors must be in working order along with any oil catch tanks. Exhaust noise is tested at a 45-degree angle, 50 centimetres (20 inches) from the tailpipe outlet. Vehicles up to 10 years old may emit not more than 96 decibels; older vehicles are allowed 103 dB.

=== Suspension ===
No bushings may be broken or in bad condition. All control arms must be in working order. There can be no rust/corrosion on springs, struts or other suspension components. If the car has 4 wheel steering, it must be working. The vehicle must also meet minimum height requirements, which will be checked by referencing the lowest part of the vehicle (not including the suspension components). For vehicles with 200–249 cm wheelbase they must be 8 cm off the ground and vehicles with 250–299 cm wheelbase they must be 9 cm off the ground. For all other vehicles for every 50 cm over 299 cm in wheelbase add .5 cm to the minimum height and for vehicles under 200 cm in wheelbase subtract .5 cm to the minimum height.

=== Interior ===
General interior equipment must be intact (i.e.: dash). Roll cages (must have padding around bars) and carpet removal is allowed. Bucket seats must measure 420 mm from left to right bank but can not be over 450 mm from left exterior side to right exterior side (total width of seat). Aftermarket seats made of fiber-reinforced plastic are not allowed. Any holes or rips in seats must either be taped or repaired.

== Older vehicles ==
As vehicles get older, maintaining them to the required standards can become expensive. Most Japanese do not get involved in mechanical repairs, and as a result, mechanics can charge high prices. Vehicles that cannot pass inspection are not permitted on public roads. Unwanted vehicles must be exported or destroyed and recycled. Many Japanese used vehicles are exported once it is no longer cost-effective to keep them in service in Japan.

== See also ==
- Vehicle inspection
- MOT test (UK)
- National Car Test (Republic of Ireland)
- Warrant of Fitness (New Zealand)
