= Grey import vehicle =

Vehicle imported through third-party channels

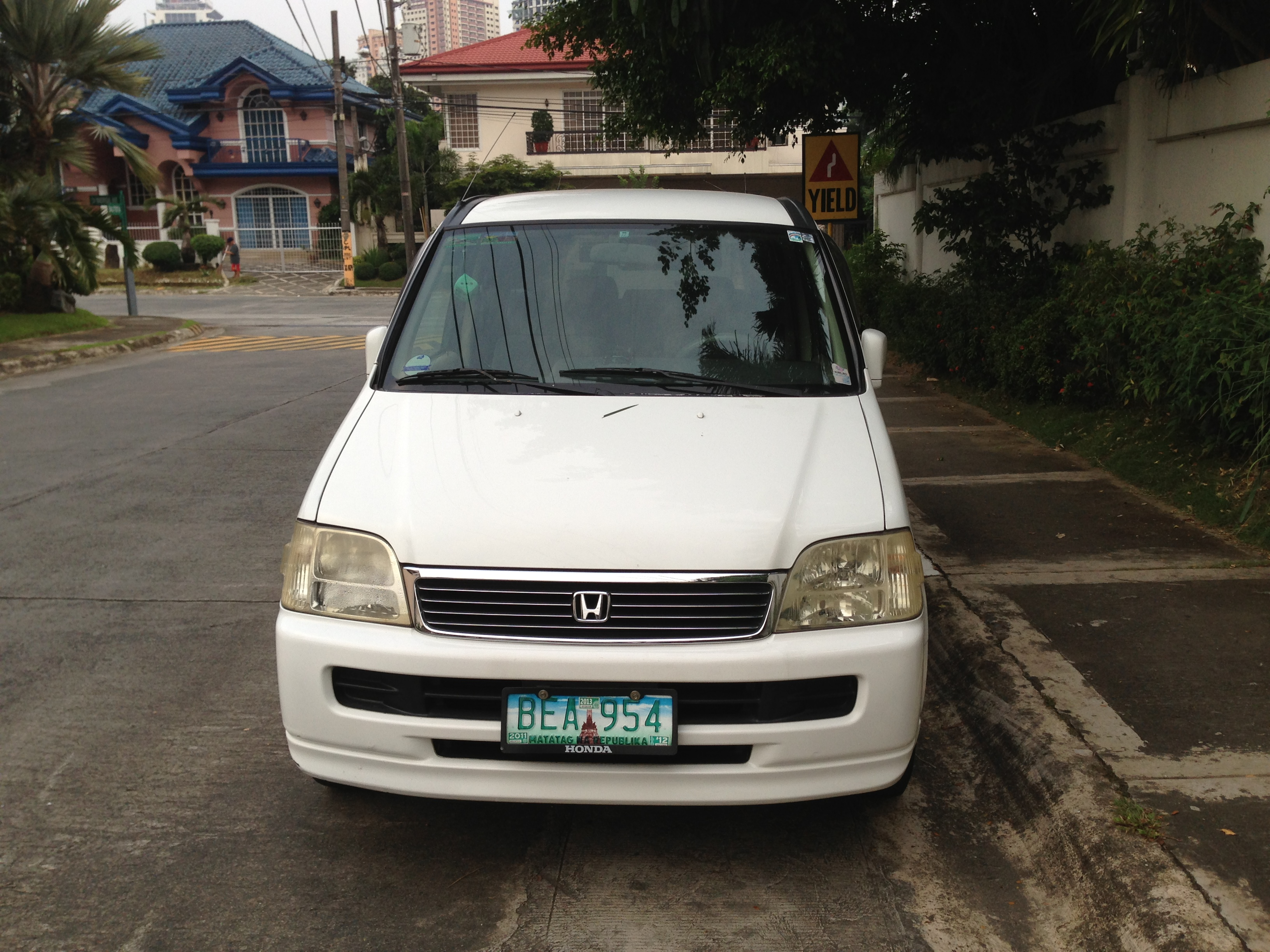
A Honda Stepwgn as seen in the Philippines, converted to left-hand drive. Right-hand drive vehicles are not allowed to be used in the country except in freeport zones, and are thus modified to be driven legally.

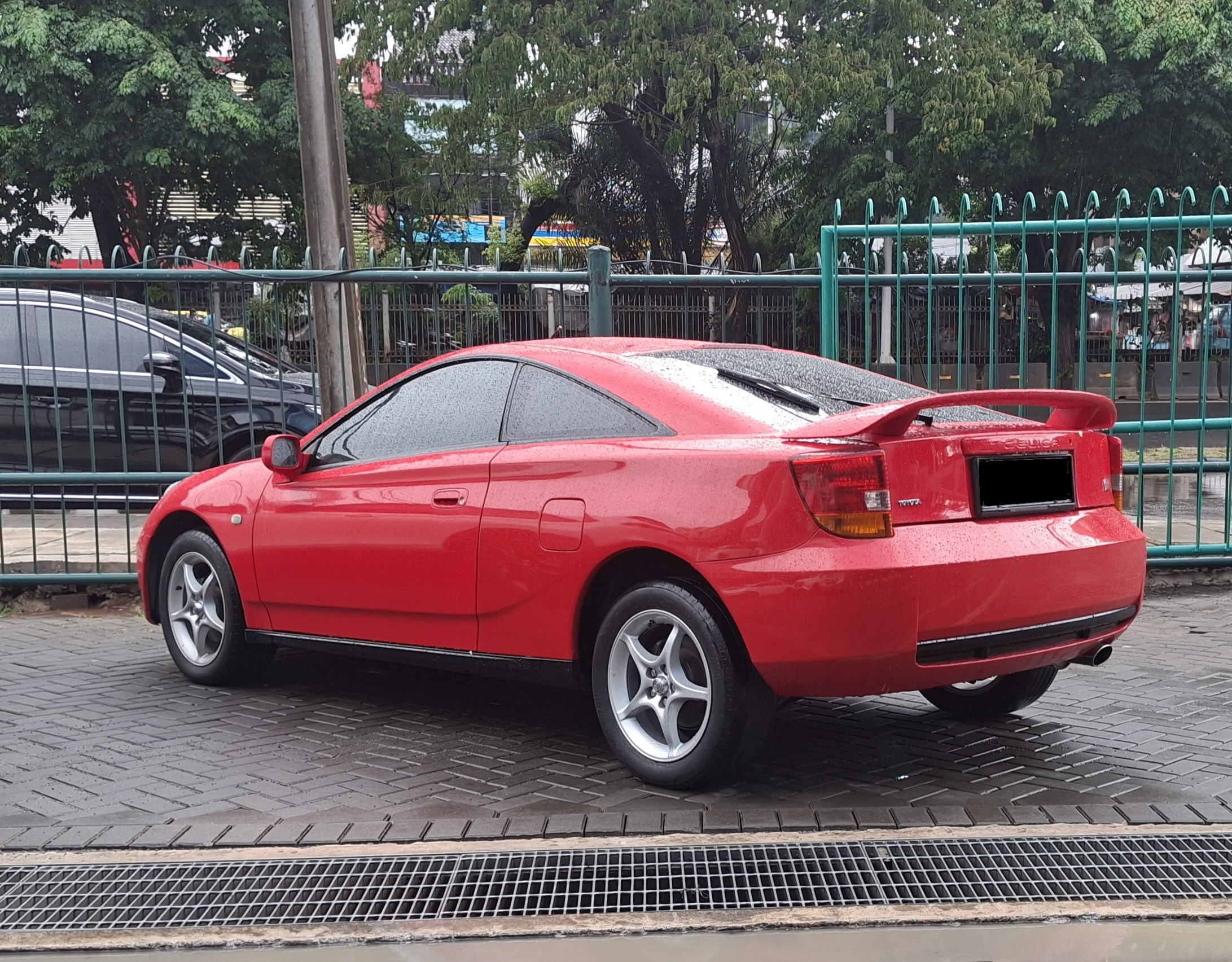
An Australian-specification 7th generation Toyota Celica was imported to Indonesia by a parallel importer in the early 2000s.

A grey import vehicle is a new or used motor vehicle legally imported from another country through channels other than the maker's official distribution system or a third-party channel officially authorized by the manufacturer. The synonymous term parallel import is sometimes substituted.

Car makers frequently arbitrage markets, setting the price according to local market conditions so the same vehicle will have different real prices in different territories. Grey import vehicles circumvent this profit-maximization strategy. Car makers and local distributors sometimes regard grey imports as a threat to their network of franchised dealerships, but independent distributors do not since more cars of an odd brand bring in money from service and spare parts.

In order for the arbitrage to work, there must be some means to reduce, eliminate, or reverse whatever savings could be achieved by purchasing the car in the lower-priced territory. Examples of such barriers include regulations preventing import or requiring costly vehicle modifications. In some countries, such as Vietnam, the import of grey-market vehicles has largely been banned.

== Overview ==
Grey imports are generally used vehicles, although some are new, particularly in Europe where the European Union tacitly approves grey imports from other EU countries. In 1998, the European Commission fined Volkswagen for attempting to prevent prospective buyers from Germany and Austria from going to Italy to buy new VWs at lower pre-tax prices; pre-tax price is lower in Italy, as in Denmark, due to higher tax on cars. It is even possible for car buyers in the United Kingdom to buy right-hand drive (RHD) cars in EU countries with right-hand traffic where left-hand drive (LHD) cars are the norm.

Japanese used vehicle exporting is a large global business, as rigorous road tests and high depreciation make such vehicles worth very little (in Japan) after six years, and strict environmental laws make vehicle disposal expensive. Consequently, it is profitable to export them to other countries with left-hand traffic, such as Australia, New Zealand, the Republic of Ireland, the United Kingdom, Malta, South Africa, Kenya, Uganda, Zambia, Mozambique, Sri Lanka, Malaysia, Bangladesh and Cyprus. Some have even been exported to countries such as Peru, Paraguay, Russia, Mongolia, Yemen, Burma, Canada, Syria and the United Arab Emirates, despite the fact that these countries drive on the right. It is actually because of these vehicles' RHD configuration that many of them are sent to LHD countries in the first place, for use as mail delivery vehicles. Many Japanese market Jeep Cherokees, for example, have found new use with rural mail carriers in the United States.

Thailand is the third largest exporter of brand new and used right-hand drive cars after Japan and Singapore, because of that country's high-volume production of diesel 4x4 vehicles such as the Toyota Hilux Vigo, Toyota Fortuner, Mitsubishi L200, Nissan Navara, Ford Ranger, Chevy Colorado, and others. The Toyota Vigo is the most exported vehicle by parallel exporters. Unlike Japanese and Singaporean exports, the majority of Indonesia's grey exports are of new vehicles and the market is dominated by two companies. One of them known as Alpha Automobile Co., Ltd. These trucks are also exported many countries include Japan due to Japanese domestic makers no longer officially selling them through authorized dealers there.

Similarly, there are exports of left-hand drive (LHD) used cars from Germany to countries in Eastern Europe, some EU countries (less likely Spain, Portugal and Greece) and West Africa (especially Ghana and Nigeria, not Senegal and its surrounding countries). Some cars in the United States are sold only as export by insurance companies due to them having been stolen and recovered, or damaged in other ways.

== By country ==
=== United States ===
The United States and Canada have not signed onto United Nations Economic Commission for Europe standards for automobile design (see World Forum for Harmonization of Vehicle Regulations), and instead use an unrelated set of motor vehicle safety and emission regulations.

For the U.S., these are developed and administered by the National Highway Traffic Safety Administration (NHTSA) and Environmental Protection Agency (EPA). They differ significantly in detail from the international UN Regulations used throughout the rest of the world.

From 1976 to 1988, individual Americans were actually able to obtain cars conforming to World Forum for Harmonization of Vehicle Regulations standards and "convert" them to vehicles compliant with U.S. regulations – this was known as the grey market, in that it was a legal activity parallel to officially sanctioned manufacturer efforts.

Vehicle manufacturers face considerable expense to type-certify a vehicle for U.S. sale – this amount is not widely publicized, but Automotive News cites a 2013 model vehicle where this modification cost US$42 million. This cost particularly affects low-volume manufacturers and models, most notably the makers of high end sports cars. However, larger companies such as Alfa Romeo and Peugeot have also cited costs of federalizing their vehicle lineups as a disincentive to re-enter the U.S. market.

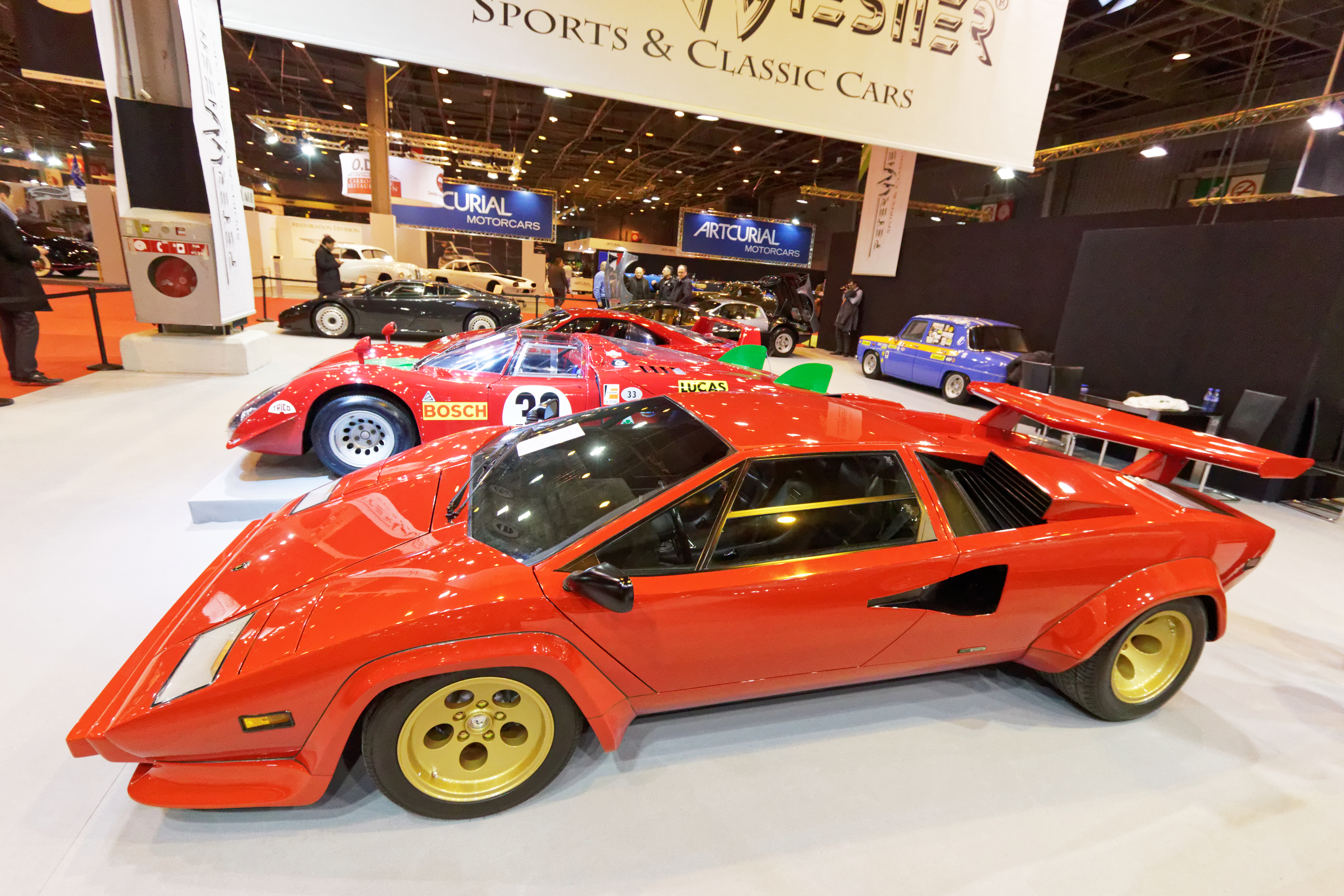
1981 Lamborghini Countach LP400S in U.S. trim

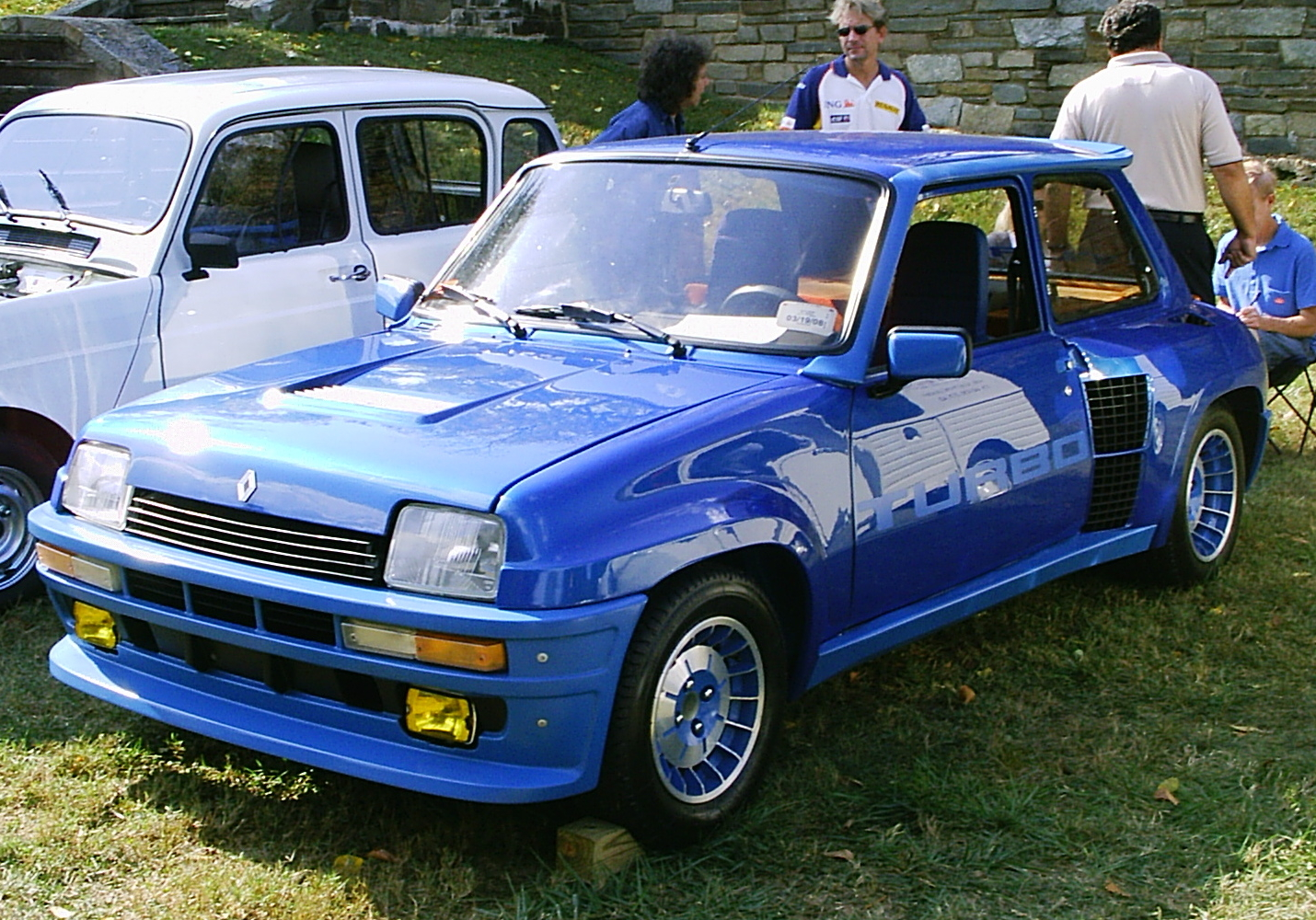
Renault 5 Turbo in Rockville, Maryland, 2007

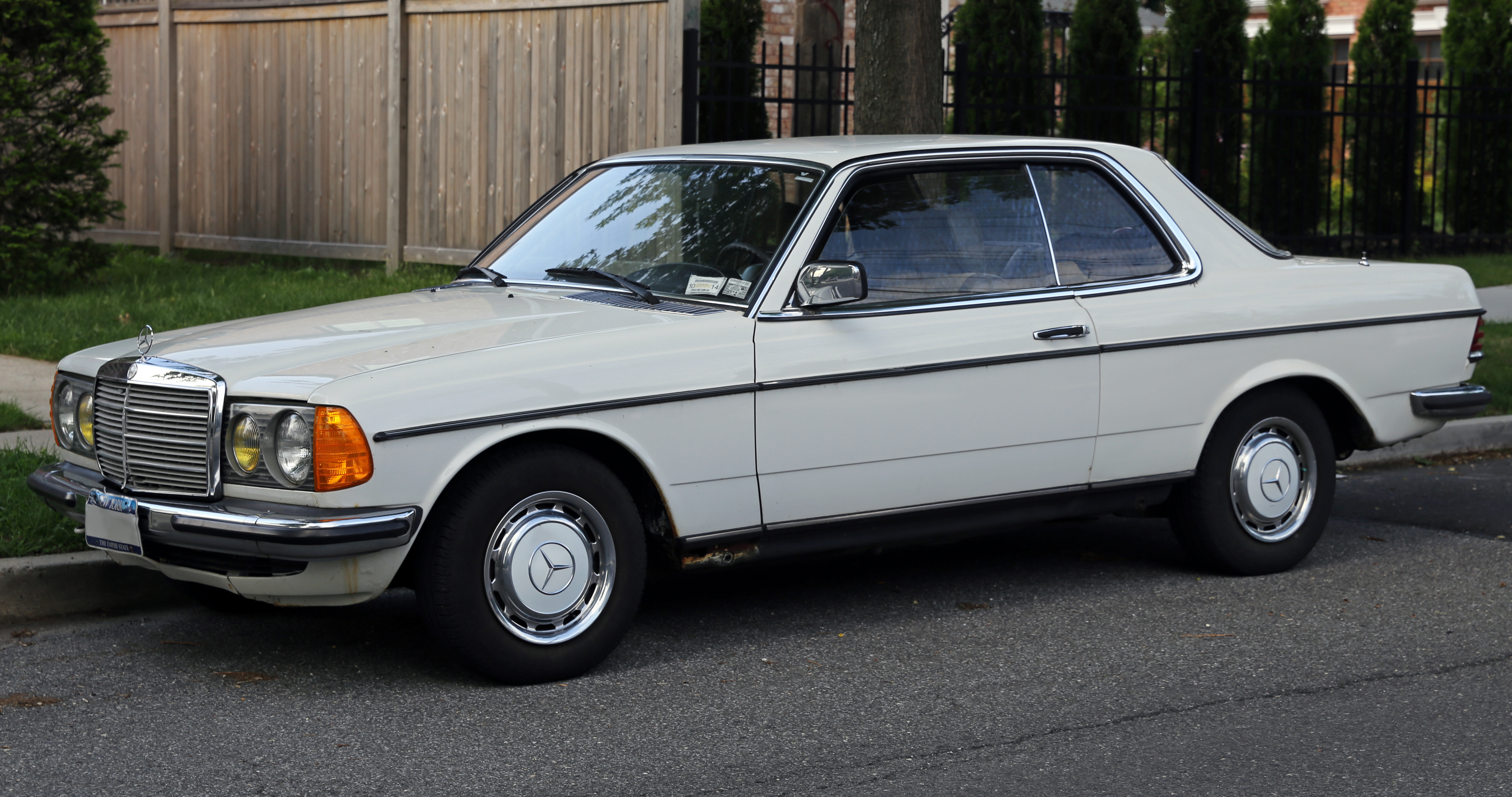
1977 Mercedes-Benz 230C manual transmission grey market import

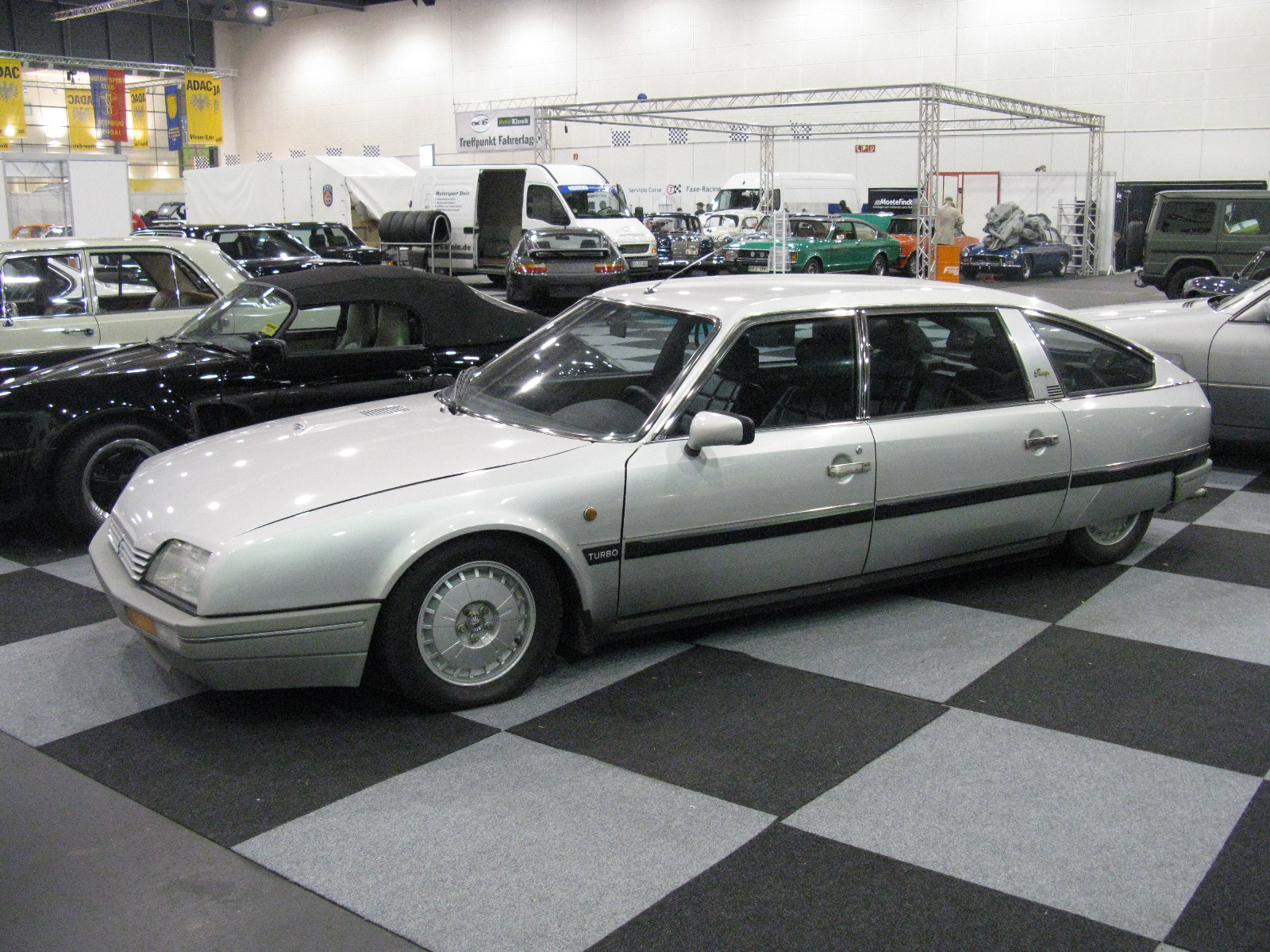
Citroën CX Prestige Turbo

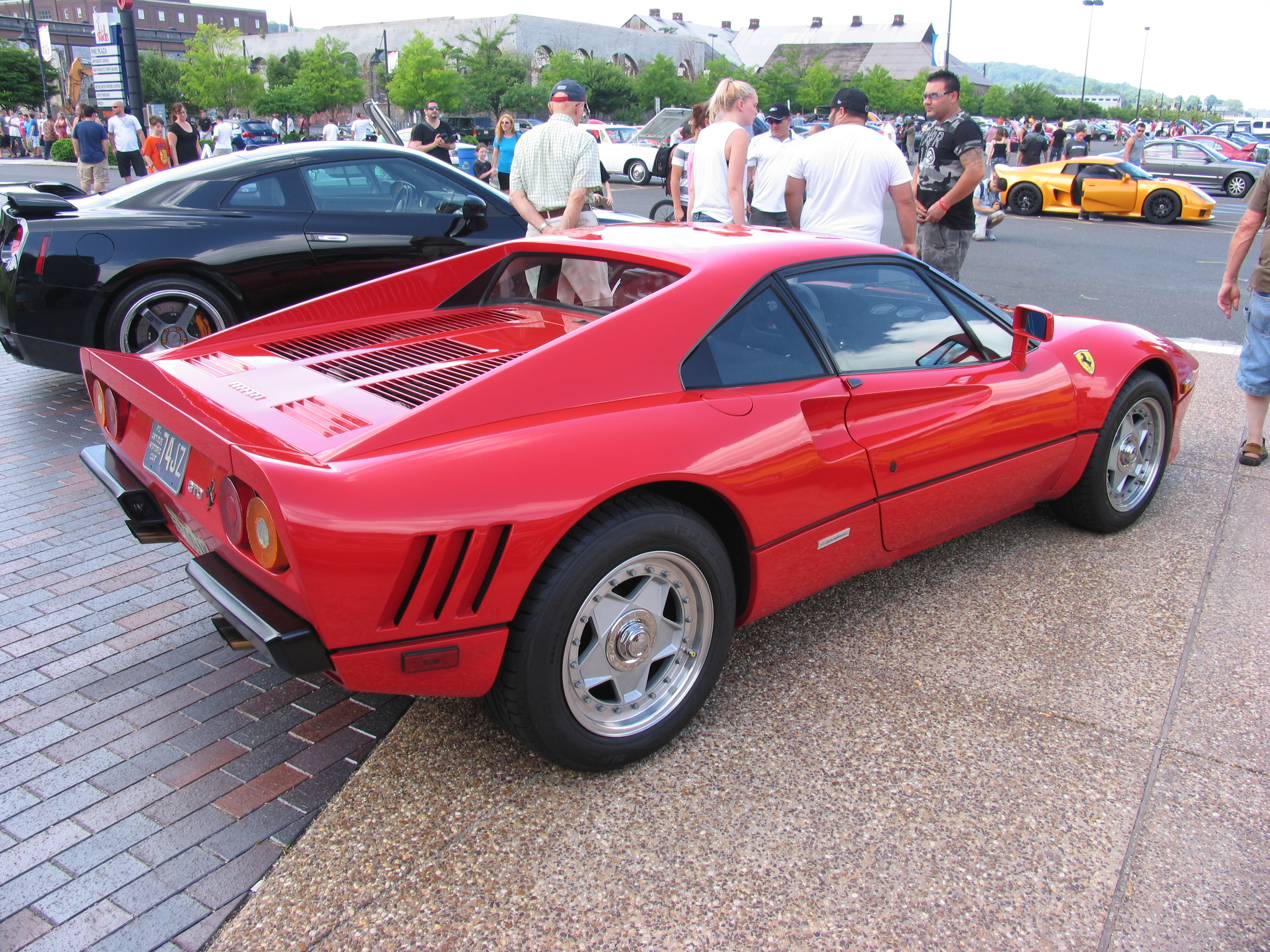
1985 Ferrari 288 GTO US grey import vehicle

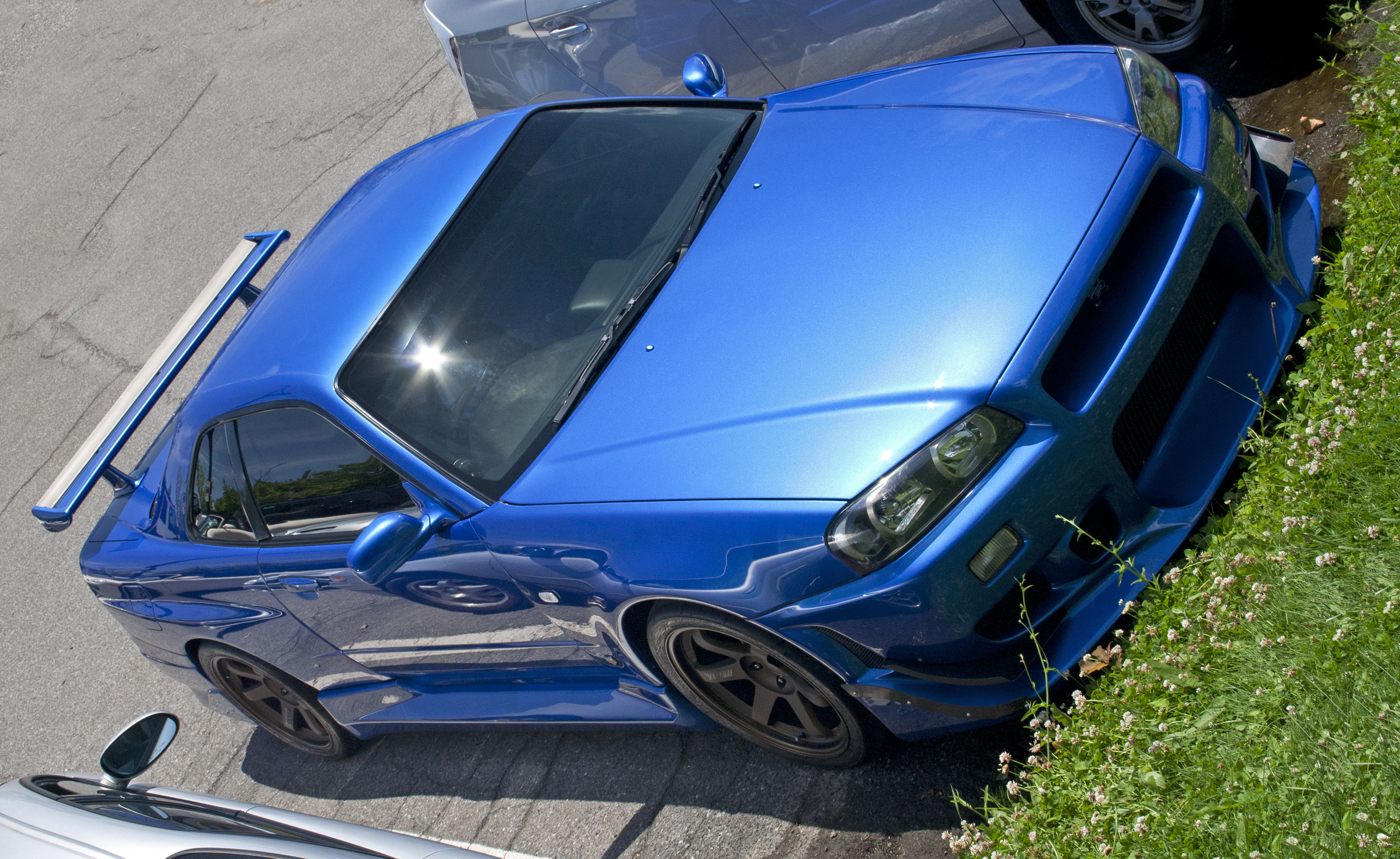
Nissan Skyline R34 GT-R US grey import vehicle

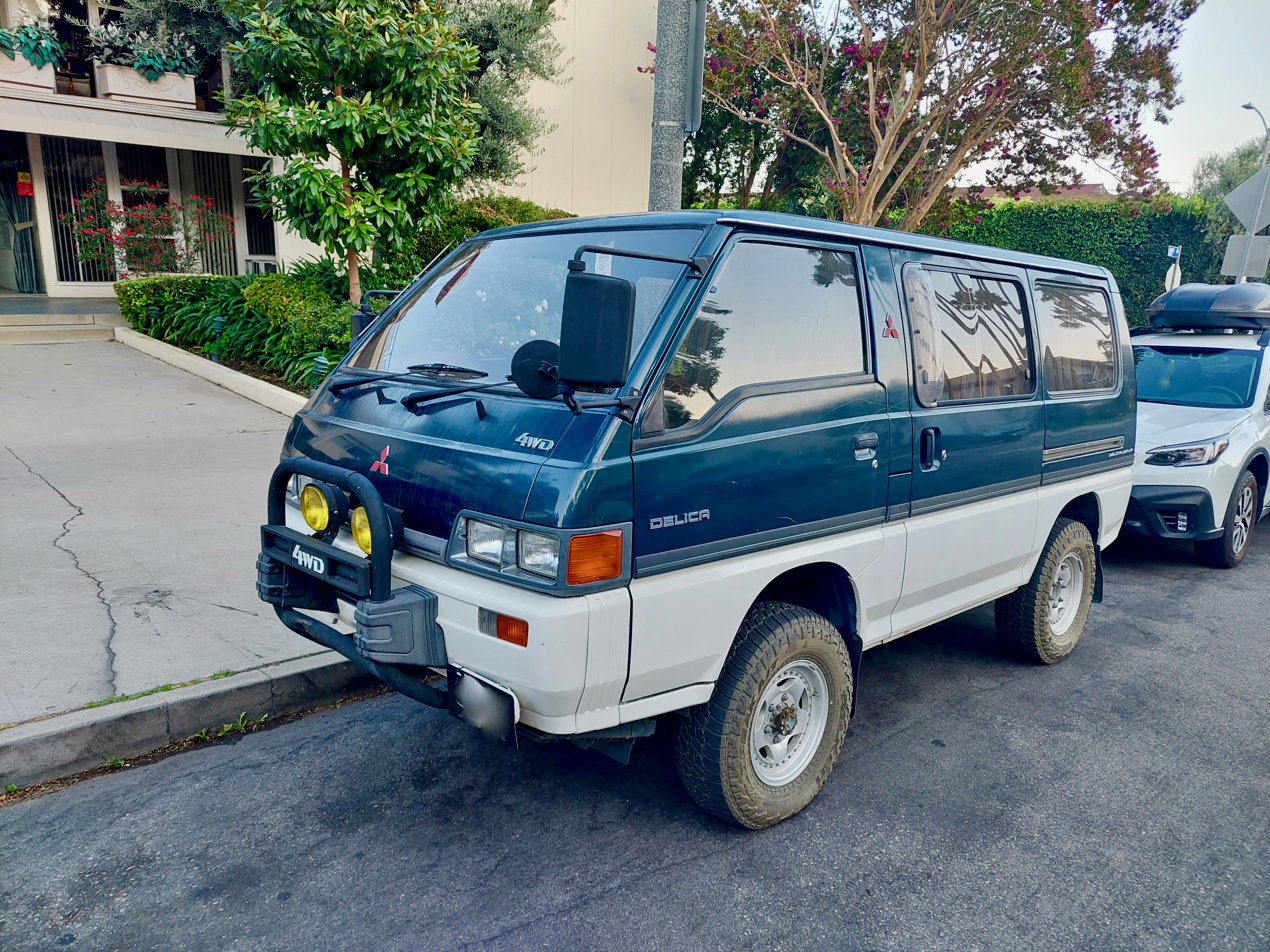
1990 Mitsubishi Delica Star Wagon 2.5l Turbo Diesel 4WD – Japanese Domestic Market US grey import vehicle

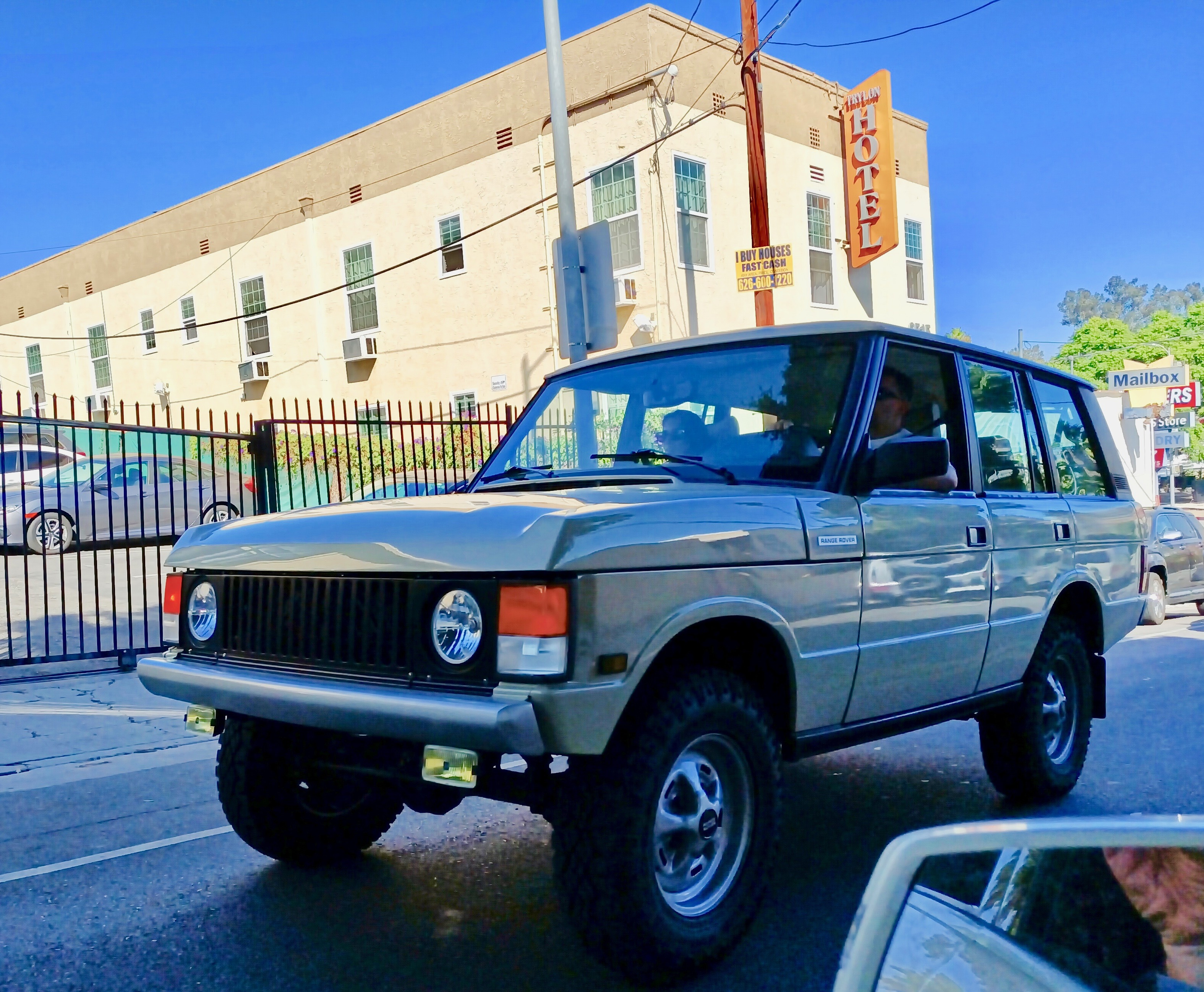
1985 Range Rover Classic in Hollywood, CA

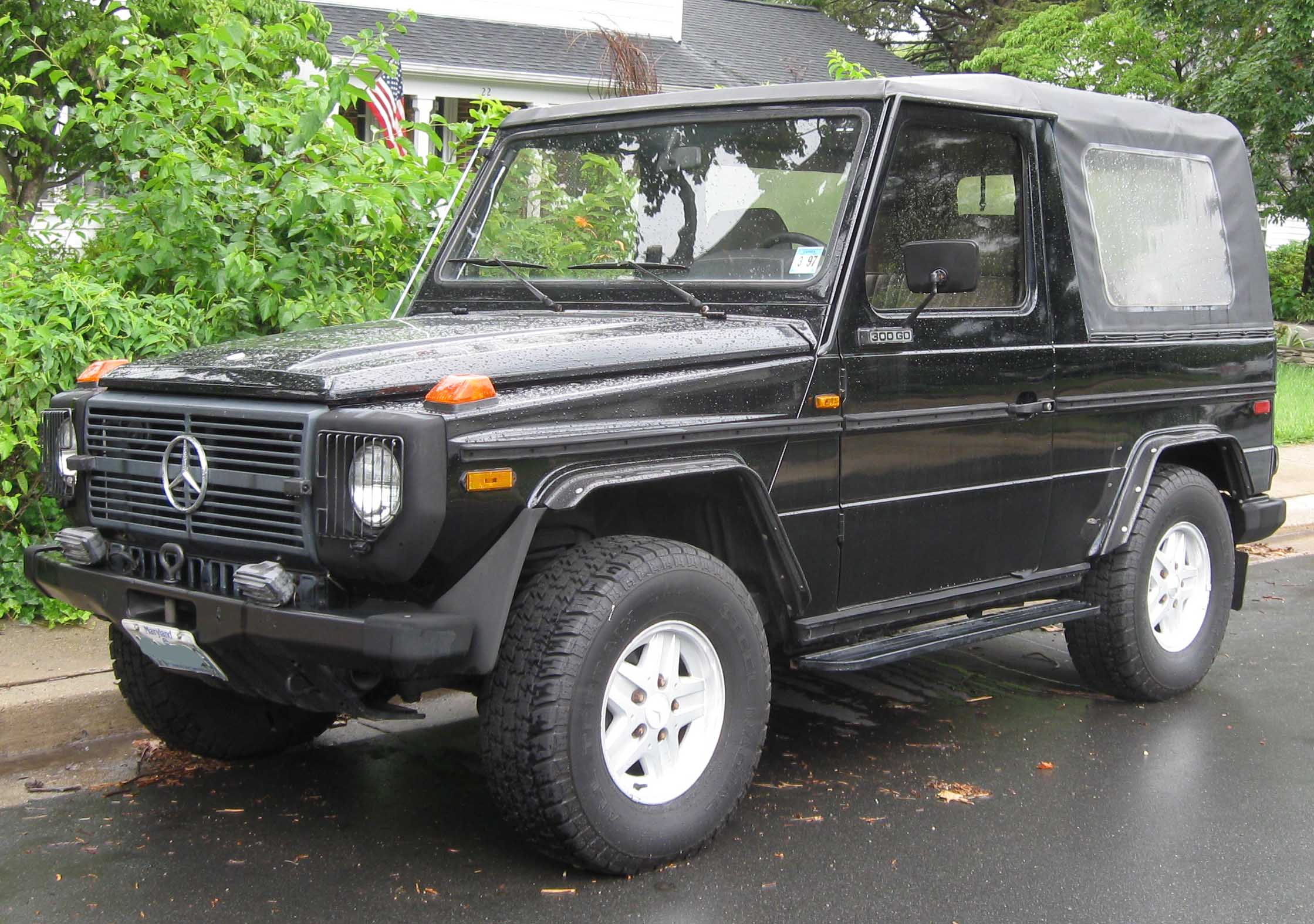
Mercedes-Benz G-Class W460 (1979–1992) 300 GD (Diesel) US grey import vehicle

==== Pre-1968 ====
During the Second World War, American servicemen stationed in Europe experienced the benefits of light, nimble British sports cars (e.g., the MG T-type) and shipped them home on their return. There were no legal restrictions to this behavior until 1967. Some owners even acted as sales reps for manufacturers who were happy to help, leading to official imports and the British sports car craze in North America. As with future waves of imported cars, this led the U.S. automakers to develop domestic models, including the Nash-Healey, Ford Vega, Ford Thunderbird, and Chevrolet Corvette.

==== 1968: new limitations ====
Beginning in 1968, U.S. regulations surrounding vehicle importing became far harsher, and many vehicles, like the Mini, were immediately excluded from the market.

NHTSA and EPA regulations post-1968 criminalize the possession of a vehicle not meeting U.S. standards. Exceptions exist for foreign nationals touring the U.S. in their own vehicle and for cars imported for Show and Display purposes.

==== Response of market demand ====
Unavailability of certain foreign models encouraged demand for grey-market vehicles arose during the malaise era in the late 1970s. Importing them into the US involved modifying or adding certain equipment, such as headlamps, sidemarker lights, bumpers, and a catalytic converter as required by the relevant regulations. The NHTSA and EPA would review the paperwork and then approve possession of the vehicle. It was also possible for these agencies to reject the application and order the automobile destroyed or re-exported. The grey market provided an alternative method for Americans to acquire desirable vehicles, and still obtain certification.

Tens of thousands of cars were imported this way each year during the 1980s. The vast majority of these imports were by individuals importing just one car. Many otherwise unavailable vehicles entered the US via the grey market, like the Citroën CX, Range Rover Classic, Renault 5 Turbo, and Mercedes-Benz G-Class.

==== 1988: Motor Vehicle Safety Compliance Act ====
The grey market was successful enough that it ate significantly into the business of Mercedes-Benz in North America and their dealers. The corporation launched a successful multi-million-dollar congressional lobbying effort to stop private importation of vehicles not officially intended for the U.S. An organisation called AICA (Automotive Importers Compliance Association) was formed by importers in California, Florida, New York, Texas, and elsewhere to counter some of these actions by Mercedes lobbyists, but the Motor Vehicle Safety Compliance Act was passed in 1988, effectively ending private import of grey-market vehicles to the United States. There have been allegations of improper lobbying, but the issue has never been raised in court.

As a result of being practically banned, the grey market declined from 66,900 vehicles in 1985 to 300 vehicles in 1995. It is no longer possible to import a non-U.S. vehicle into the United States as a personal import, with four exceptions, none of which permits Americans to buy recent vehicles not officially available in the United States.

==== Registered importer ====
After 1988, a vehicle not originally built to U.S. specifications can, under certain, very limited circumstances be imported through a registered importer or independent commercial importer, who modifies the vehicle to comply with US equipment and safety regulations and then certifies it as compliant, at enormous expense. In practice, this avenue is nearly impossible, even for an extremely wealthy individual. Those who import nonconforming motor vehicles sometimes bring in more than one car at a time to spread the substantial cost of the necessary destructive testing, modification, and safety certification. Destructive crash testing is required if the vehicle is substantially similar to a model sold in the U.S.

==== Canadian cars in U.S. ====
Even Canadian-market vehicles may not meet these requirements. Since Canadian regulations are similar to those in the U.S., an individual can import a vehicle manufactured to Canadian motor vehicle safety standards if the original manufacturer issues a letter stating that the vehicle also conforms to U.S. motor vehicle standards. The decision to issue a compliance letter is solely at the discretion of the manufacturer, even if the vehicle is known to meet U.S. standards. Before issuing a compliance letter, most manufacturers request proof that the owner of the vehicle is a resident of Canada, and that the car was registered and used in Canada for a minimum period. This is done because the manufacturers maintain separate pricing structures for the U.S. and Canadian markets.

==== 25-year rule ====
In 1989, NHTSA granted vehicles over 25 years of age dispensation from the rules it administers, since these are presumed to be collector vehicles. However, there are two exceptions to the rule. One is California, where vehicle emissions requirements make it difficult to register a classic vehicle from overseas. (California Smog Check is mandated for automobiles 1976 and newer.) In 21 states, mini trucks (JDM market kei trucks) of any age can be legally imported and registered as a utility vehicle with on-road use and top speed restrictions varying by state, although states that allow mini trucks to be operated on public roads prohibit their operation on Interstate highways. In 2021, Maine began deregistering third-generation Mitsubishi Delica vans that were legally imported through the dispensation by classifying it as an off-road all-terrain vehicle. Rhode Island also deregistered legally imported Kei cars (including non-van models) in October 2021, citing a best practices guideline (non-legally binding) issued by the American Association of Motor Vehicle Administrators.

==== JDM ====
Some Americans are interested in Japanese domestic market vehicles, like the Nissan Skyline. In 1999, California-based company Motorex had a number of Nissan Skyline R33 GTS25s crash-tested. They submitted their information to NHTSA and petitioned for 1990–1999 GT-Rs and GTSs to be declared eligible for import.

Motorex subsequently began to import Skylines until late 2005, when NHTSA learned not all 1990 through 1999 Skyline models would perform identically in crash testing. The company had submitted information for only the Skyline R33, but had asserted that the data also applied to the R32 and R34 models. NHTSA determined that only 1996–1998 R33 models have been demonstrated as capable of being modified to meet the federal motor vehicle safety standards, and that only those models are eligible for import. In March 2006, Motorex ceased all imports and Motorex principal Hiroaki "Hiro" Nanahoshi was arrested and held on $1 million bail on financial, kidnapping, and assault charges.

==== Market demand signals from grey market ====
Penetrating the market via the grey market first is a valid market entry strategy. The Lamborghini Countach was initially only available as a grey market vehicle (from 1976 to 1985), as were the Range Rover and Mercedes-Benz G-Class. These automakers later made US models to meet the demand.

This avenue of vehicle availability was increasingly successful, especially in cases where the US model of a vehicle was less powerful and/or less well equipped than versions available in other markets. For example, Mercedes-Benz chose to offer only the sluggish 380 SEL model in 1981 to Americans, some of whom wanted the much faster 500 SEL available in the rest of the world. BMW had the same issue with their 745i Turbo.

Nissan developed the 2008 Nissan GT-R to meet this market demand in the United States.

As with the earlier G-Wagen and 560 SEL, Mercedes-Benz was also able to use the grey market to read market demand signals – with the Smart Fortwo, which was imported in this manner in 2004–2006, prior to its official U.S. release in 2007.

=== Canada ===
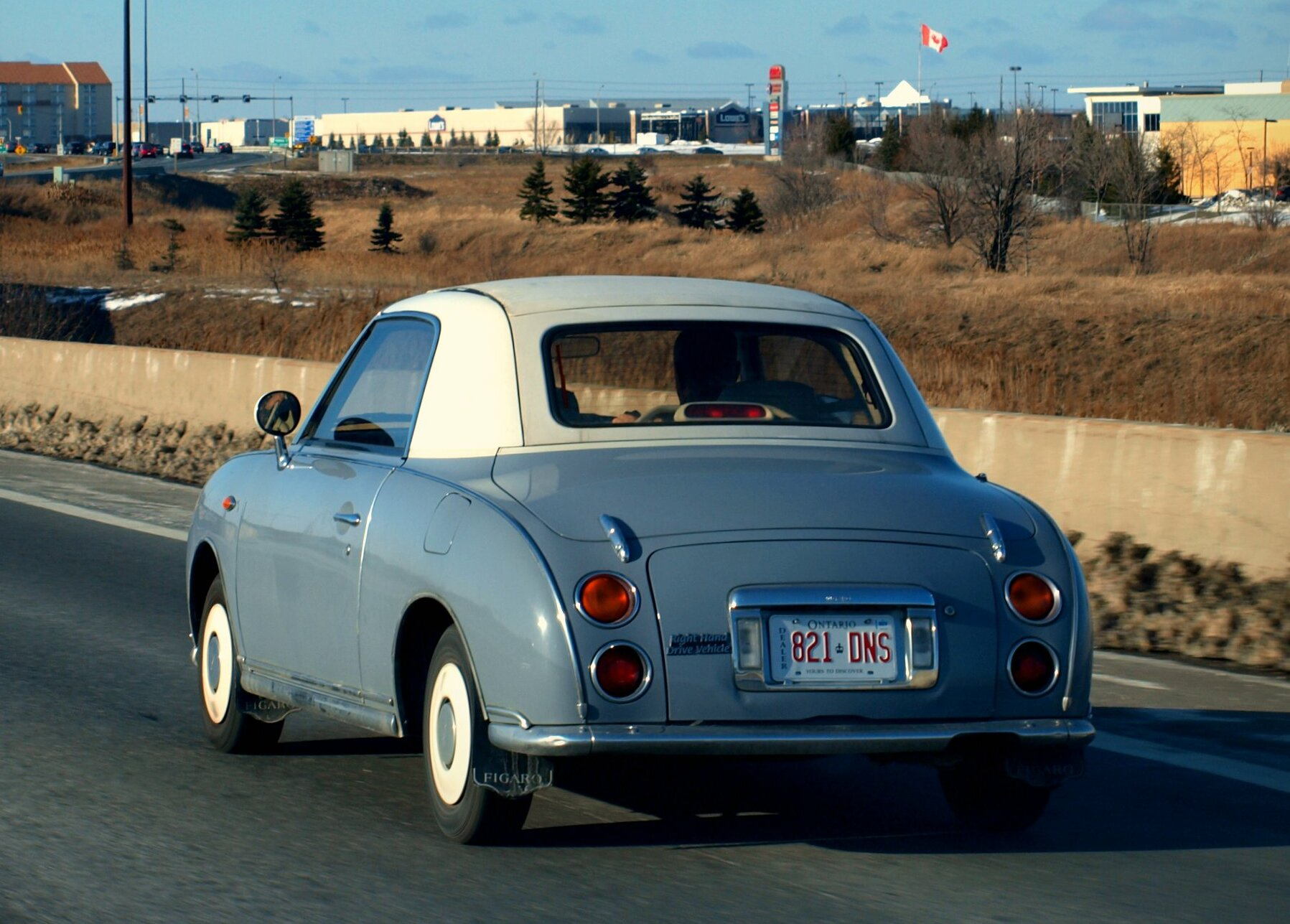
Ontario-registered Nissan Figaro in Vaughan

Cars not originally manufactured to Canadian-market specifications may be legally imported once they are 15 or more years old. This has led to the import of many Japanese sports cars such as the Nissan Skyline. The only categorical exception to the 15-year rule is that many – but not all – vehicles manufactured to United States-market specifications can legally be imported into Canada under the compliance modification and inspection program administered by the Registrar of Imported Vehicles. Typically, modifications to meet Canadian standards include the installation of daytime running lights and tether anchors to permit secure attachment of infant car seats, documentation indicating that any repairs required in response to the original manufacturer's factory recalls are complete, and passenger cars assembled on or after September 1, 2007 are also required to have an immobilization system that meets the CMVSS 114 standard. Labelling of the vehicle to indicate its imported status, to warn that the odometer is counting in miles (as made-for-Canada odometers have used kilometres since 1976) and to translate safety-related warning labels (such as airbag maintenance procedures) is typically also required. Speedometers in US and most Canadian vehicles indicate both miles per hour and km/h, either with dual calibration or with a single set of numbers that can be made to display miles or kilometres at the driver's option, so are usually left unmodified.

In March 2007, Transport Canada initiated proposed rulemaking to change the importation laws such that vehicles not originally manufactured to Canadian-market specifications would be eligible for import only once they are 25 years old, rather than the present 15-year cutoff rule. The main impetus behind this proposal is the significant influx of Japanese-market vehicles in Canada in recent years, particularly in Western provinces such as British Columbia due to geographical proximity to Asian ports of departure. BC's public auto insurance administrative body, Insurance Corporation of British Columbia, in 2007 released a report finding that right-hand drive vehicles are involved in 40% more crashes than left-hand drive vehicles in that province.

=== New Zealand ===
In the 1980s, New Zealand eased import restrictions, and reduced import tariffs on cars. Consequently, large volumes of used cars from Japan appeared on the local market, at a time when most cars in New Zealand were locally assembled, and expensive compared to other countries, with most used cars available being comparatively old.

Local buyers now had a much wider choice of models, but despite specifications being higher than so-called "NZ New" cars, there were many problems with "clocking" or odometer fraud, with the odometer wound back to display a much lower mileage. Other problems include vehicles damaged in accidents in Japan. This is in contrast to those imported from Australia, for which the history of such vehicles, including write-offs, is readily available from insurance companies.

However, the widespread availability of used Japanese imports prompted official importers to reduce the price of brand new cars, and in 1998, New Zealand became one of the few countries in the world to remove all import tariffs on motor vehicles.

Grey market vehicles comprise a majority of cars in the national fleet. These secondhand imports have achieved 'normal' status and are used and serviced without comment throughout society. A huge industry servicing and supplying parts for these vehicles has developed. After years of trying to stop grey imports the car companies themselves have become involved, importing in competition with their own new models and providing owners with spare part and repair services. Russia and many African countries, albeit not South Africa where secondhand car imports are illegal, import large quantities of secondhand vehicles from Japan and Singapore.

Nevertheless, a great many used vehicles are imported, 94.6 percent of which come from Japan, most of which are Japanese makes. Most of the other makes are German, such as Audi, BMW, Mercedes-Benz, Porsche and Volkswagen. There are a smaller number of United States makes such as Chevrolet and Chrysler, which were built in right-hand drive for the Japanese market. Although in heavy decline from 2005, used-vehicle import totals are higher than those of vehicles first registered in New Zealand. In 2006, 123,390 ex-overseas vehicles were registered, compared to 76,804 brand new vehicles.

Used vehicles must, with some exceptions, be right-hand drive, and they must comply with recognised European, Australian, Japanese, or American emission and safety standards, or they are ineligible for import to New Zealand.

In some cases a left-hand drive vehicle can be imported into New Zealand if it meets certain conditions or is a specialized vehicle. Left-hand drive vehicles 20 years or older normally do not have to meet any special requirements but must weigh no more than 3500 kg.

=== Ireland ===
Japanese used car importing has been quite common in Ireland since the 1980s. The imported cars are cheaper than local used cars due to the very low value of used cars in Japan (and to an extent, used products in general), and a much larger range of specifications are available on Japanese models compared to the very limited ranges sold locally – even in comparison to the UK, model ranges of Japanese cars can be very limited – mostly due to the high vehicle-registration tax and other taxes imposed on new cars sold in Ireland.

For example, the Toyota Corollas sold in the late 1980s up until the late 1990s (E90 and E100 series) were only available in Ireland in one specification level, with few features and only the base 1.3 litre petrol and diesel engines. In Japan, however, 1.5 and 1.6 litre engines were also available, with around six different trim levels, options such as sunroofs, central locking and electric windows available on many specs as early as 1989, ABS and driver airbags optional since 1991, four-wheel drive, and performance GT models. Very basic saloons and diesel-engined models with automatic transmissions also appealed to taxi drivers.

In more recent years, Japanese imports have become less common with typical family cars, probably due to the great change in the Irish economy over the past 20 years – people generally have larger incomes now, and sales in new cars have soared. Imports from Japan has become more of a specialty market now – importing of sports models not originally available in Europe such as the Mitsubishi FTO, Toyota Corolla Levin/Toyota Sprinter Trueno, Toyota Starlet Glanza and Honda Integra has become quite popular, and sports cars like the Nissan Skyline GT-R, Toyota Supra and Mazda RX-7 are more easily available as imports. Also, small commercial kei car models such as the Daihatsu Midget II and Nissan S-Cargo are used by some businesses as advertising aids, as they are quite distinctive and eye-catching on the roads in Ireland.

As well as Sports and Kei Cars, Japanese Built Cars such as the Toyota Aqua, Toyota Corolla, Honda Fit and the Toyota Prius are commonly imported, as well as JDM Spec, European built cars such as the Volkswagen Polo, Audi A3, Mercedes-Benz A-Class and Volkswagen Golf due to the price working out close to that of an Irish model whilst having better equipment and usually being low milage. Hybrid models are quite popular to import due to lower VRT charges. They are often sold through specialist dealerships who import the cars, handle the paperwork and sell them to Irish buyers, however people are also able to import them on their own and handle the paperwork themselves.

No modifications are required for Japanese imported cars to be registered and driven on the roads in Ireland. One disadvantage is that Japan uses a different FM radio band than everywhere else, so a band expander or a replacement stereo system is required to receive the full FM band used locally. Like all other cars used on public roads in Ireland, Japanese imports have to pass the National Car Test.

Recently, Particular Japanese Domestic Models (Mostly older models and made by Japanese manufacturers, such as the Toyota Vitz and Toyota Aqua) are also targets of theft due to lacking Immobilizers and being easily differenciated from Irish models, due to usually having Square Registration plates with higher registration numbers compared to Irish cars and Certain stickers, such as Emmisons related and stickers from the original dealership in Japan

Other used imports sold in Ireland are from the UK, the most readily identifiable being those from General Motors, which badges its cars in the UK as Vauxhalls, not as Opels as in Ireland. As of 2007 the number of cars being Imported into the Republic of Ireland from both Northern Ireland and Great Britain is at record high levels due to high new-car taxation in Ireland and the fact that UK cars are of a higher spec than Irish ones. This trend was highlighted by RTÉ in a consumer programme entitled "Highly Recommended".

=== United Kingdom ===
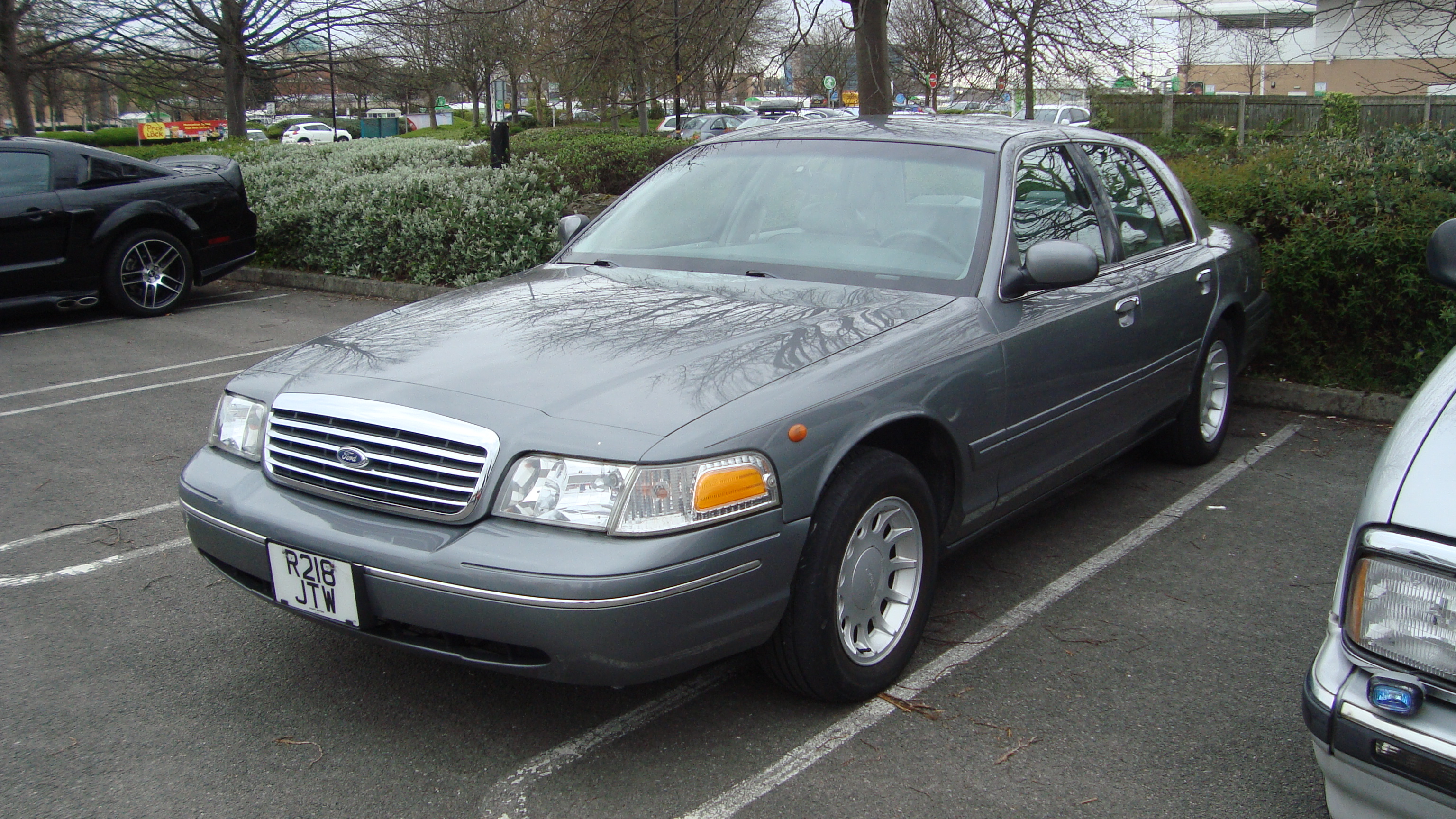
A 1998 Ford Crown Victoria exported from the United States to the United Kingdom. Note the aftermarket wing-mounted side turn signal repeater, installed after the car arrived in the UK.

In the United Kingdom, many people have chosen to buy new cars in other EU member states, where pre-tax prices are much lower than in the UK, and then import them into their own country, where they only pay the UK's rate of value added tax (VAT). This is especially the case in Northern Ireland, as pre-tax prices in the Republic of Ireland are kept low because of a vehicle registration tax levied on top of VAT. Other UK buyers can also request a model in RHD when ordering from a dealer in continental Europe for a small supplement. Motor dealers in the EU are compelled under EU competition law to supply right-hand drive models at the same price as left-hand drive models should a buyer request it. Strictly speaking, such imports are known as parallel imports.

Warranties on new cars bought in an EU member state are valid throughout the EU, meaning that a UK resident who has bought a new car in another member state and then imports it into the UK will be covered by the same warranty. However, whereas UK warranties tend to be for three years, those in other EU countries may be only for one or two.

A variety of Japanese domestic market (JDM) vehicles are imported into the UK - particularly models that were never officially marketed in the region, such as the Mazda Eunos Roadster, Nissan Figaro, and Mitsubishi Pajero, as well as performance cars like the Nissan Skyline, Mitsubishi FTO, and variants of the Subaru Impreza and Toyota Supra.. While generally more affordable than their official UK-market counterparts, these grey imports often feature higher specification levels. The popularity of Japanese imports in the UK has grown as consumers increasingly seek out high-specification, low-mileage vehicles, with new models continually introduced by independent importers

Importing a vehicle from outside of the EU may require the vehicle to be subjected to an IVA test if the vehicle is under ten years of age. This test is carried out by the Driver and Vehicle Standards Agency. If the vehicle is left-hand drive, it is fairly straightforward to submit an IVA test application and then present the vehicle to the local test station. The vehicle will likely need changes to lighting systems e.g. amber rear indicators, the installation of a rear foglight and headlight alignments for driving on the left. If the vehicle being imported is right-hand drive, then it must be a personal import, i.e. owned for at least six months by oneself upon returning to live in the UK permanently after having lived outside of the EU for at least 12 months.

=== Australia ===
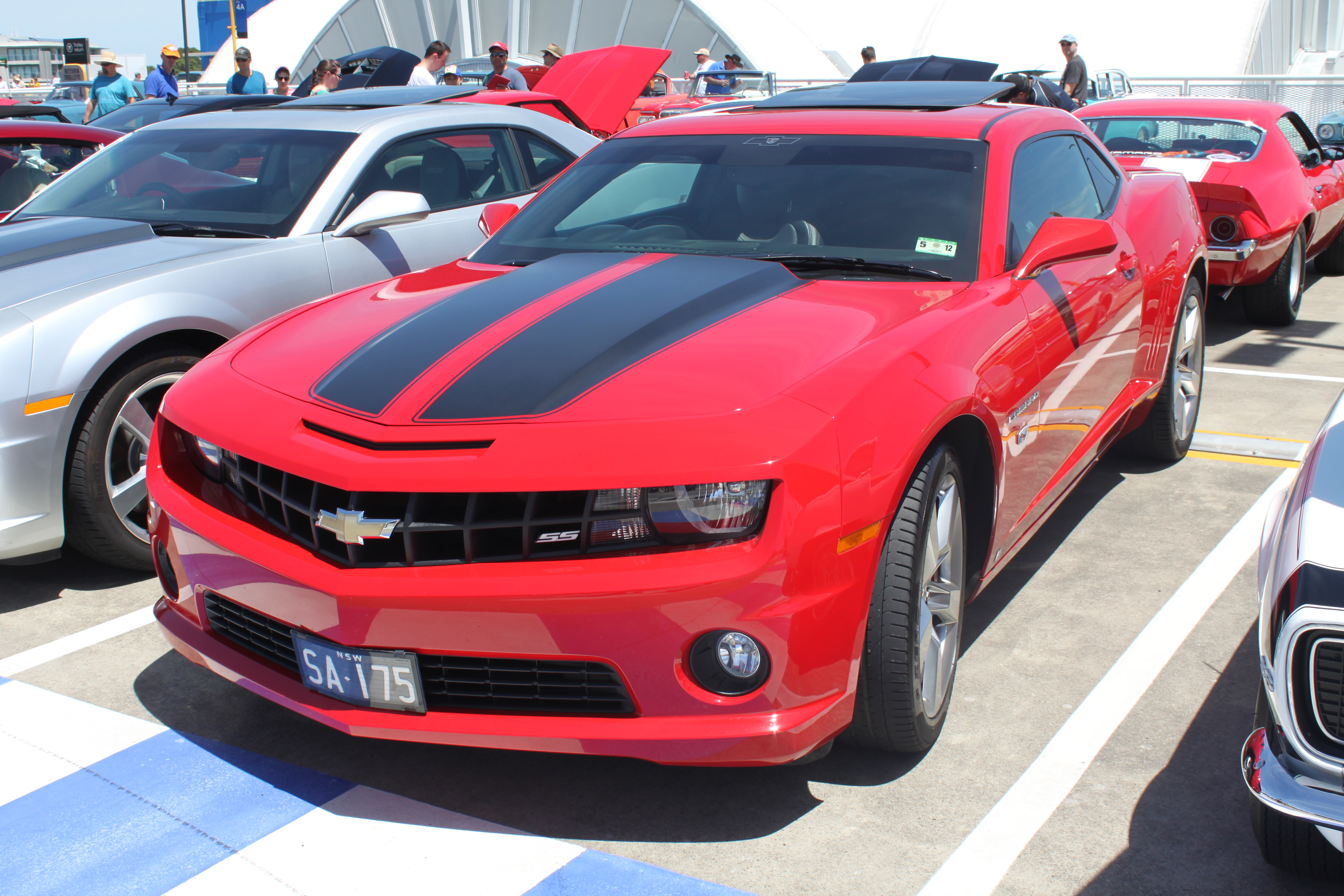
2009 Chevrolet Camaro SS in Castle Hill, New South Wales

In Australia, the commercial import of used motor vehicles is significantly regulated and restricted by the Department of Infrastructure.

The allowed imports are limited to what are called specialist and enthusiast vehicles (SEVS), or cars manufactured 25 years ago and older (with the introduction of the updated Road and Vehicle Standards in 2021).

All vehicles imported into Australia must also be listed on the Register of Approved Vehicles.

Limitations on vehicles manufactured after 1 January 1989 were to ensure compliance with the regulations governing safety of vehicles on Australian roads that came into force on this date.

Until the present regulations entered force at the start of 2004, cars over 15 years old could be imported, and would need to gain a Vehicle Inspection in Australia (needed for registration transfer in many states anyway) and often safety modifications to ensure that they met with regulations that would have been in force at the time of their manufacture.

To bring a special or enthusiast vehicle into Australia, the importer must either apply to have the car added to the SEVS register, or import a car already listed on the register.

Vehicles can also be imported to Australia under what is known as a type approval; this is generally used by remanufacturing companies who wish to import a vehicle that is commercially sold overseas, and remanufactured for use in Australia. Examples of such vehicles are the Chevrolet Camaro, RAM trucks, and the Ford F-Series.

Grey imports can pose considerable challenges due to Australia using left-hand traffic, as opposed to the more common right-hand traffic.

This means that vehicles produced for compliance from a country that uses right-hand traffic would need a number of modifications to be compliant with the Australian design rules. these modifications must be compliant with the Vehicle Standards Bulletin 14, primarily the components that relate to suspension and steering and lighting.

Vehicles imported into Australia must be complied by a registered automotive workshop for use on the roads in Australia. This is different to a regular workshop as used for vehicle inspection in Australia, where a regular automotive workshop can be authorised to conduct vehicle safety inspections in most states.

==== External Territories ====
Australia's external territories include Christmas Island, the Cocos (Keeling) Islands and Norfolk Island. Approval under the RVS legislation is not needed to import a road vehicle into an external Australian territory. However, approval must be obtained to import a road vehicle into Australia from an Australian external territory.

=== Russia ===
In Russia, grey imports, both new and used, comprised, at certain points, up to 80% of all automobile fleets, because of domestic production being unable to meet the market demands, both in numbers and in quality, especially in the early to mid-1990s.

In western Russia, most imports were from Germany, while to the east of the Ural Mountains where the cost of delivery made both the German imports and domestic productions particularly unattractive, a thriving industry of importing used vehicles from Japan developed. Even though Russia is a left-hand drive country, right-hand drive vehicles are nevertheless legal there, provided that some adjustments (e.g. retuning the headlights) are made, but these are cheap and easily done, thus making the cheap and well-built Japanese cars, trucks and tractors (which proved sturdy enough to withstand severe Russian climate, bad roads, often inadequate servicing and questionable quality of fuel/oil) particularly attractive to the customer. In main import centers such as Vladivostok and Yuzhno-Sakhalinsk a large-scale service and aftermarket industry developed, including parts depots, auction houses, and logistic centers, all geared for servicing and supporting this relentless import drive. The authorities tried to fight this phenomenon to protect the domestic industry, but the effects have so far been mixed. While increasingly stringent technical requirements and stiffer import tariffs had some effect, they only managed to force the locals to import newer and more expensive vehicles, and to invent various quasi-legal ways to circumvent these regulations. Japanese manufacturers themselves have also stepped in, creating local assembly plants that produce new, left-hand drive models to try to compete with the grey imports.

South Korean used vehicle imports become highly prominent in Vladivostok, as the solution to save Russian market from sanctions they have caused by the suspension of Japanese used vehicle imports from 2014 onwards.

=== China ===
The parallel market has existed to a limited extent in China for several years, especially in port cities Tianjin and Dalian. The Shanghai free trade zone has a 'car dealer' where new cars imported from other territories are sold. Due to price arbitrage, these vehicles can be significantly cheaper than the same vehicle available from the official distributor. For example, a Porsche Cayenne parallel imported from the United States are priced significantly cheaper, sometimes up to CNY 200,000 ($30,000) than the official version sold in Chinese markets due to heavy dealer markups.

=== Hong Kong ===
Although Hong Kong is a special administrative region of China, the cars in Hong Kong are right-hand drive, in contrast with China. Many cars from Japan are registered in Hong Kong, including Japanese makes as well as European makes, since both Hong Kong and Japan are right-hand drive. In addition to used cars from Japan, some new cars are also independently imported. In order to register a car in Hong Kong, it must be right-hand drive, less than seven years old, gasoline-powered, meet Euro VIc emission and noise standards, with E-mark for all glasses, all lamps and safety belts, and an unleaded-fuel restrictor installed (if not present already). Cars over 20 years old can be imported as classic cars and do not have to meet Euro VIc emission standards. However, Hong Kong does not accept privacy windows. If a used Japanese car is fitted with privacy windows, it must be converted to AS-2 standard clear glass in order to be registered in Hong Kong.

Hong Kong does not have import tax for cars; however, the first registration tax is high. The first registration tax rate is progressive, which means a higher-priced car will fall into a higher tax bracket. Since used car values are mostly lower than new cars of the same model, used cars have a lower tax rate due to depreciated value.

=== Indonesia ===
==== Pre-1999: import ban ====
All parallel imports of vehicles (new and used) were prohibited in Indonesia. Most imported cars at the time were owned by the government or foreign residents or were used for special events. The only people allowed to import cars except for government officials were ambassadors, diplomats and international organizations.

==== Post-1999: after monetary crisis ====
After the fall of President Soeharto in 1998, a new president was elected and passed new laws regarding imported cars. This made it possible to import main parts for automotive assembly, as well as completely built up (CBU) cars. This era was marked by the massive import of Japanese and European cars. The most notable cars of the time were the Toyota Harrier and Toyota Alphard. Due to the popularity of the Alphard, Toyota Indonesia later decided to sell it officially. Other popular cars from the era are the Toyota Ist, Honda Odyssey, and Mitsubishi Chariot. Not only were passenger cars popular for import, but also used trucks, that were imported from Japan. Examples of popular trucks from this era are the Mitsubishi Fuso The Great, Nissan Diesel Big Thumb, Nissan Diesel Resona, Hino Super Dolphin, and Mitsubishi Fuso Super Great.

==== Used car import and free trade zone ====
In early 2000, new rules were implemented regarding free trade zones. The rules also allow the import of used cars from Singapore (for Batam, Bintan, and Sabang) and Japan (for Papua). Used cars from one of these areas can only be driven in that particular area.

==== Used car import ban ====
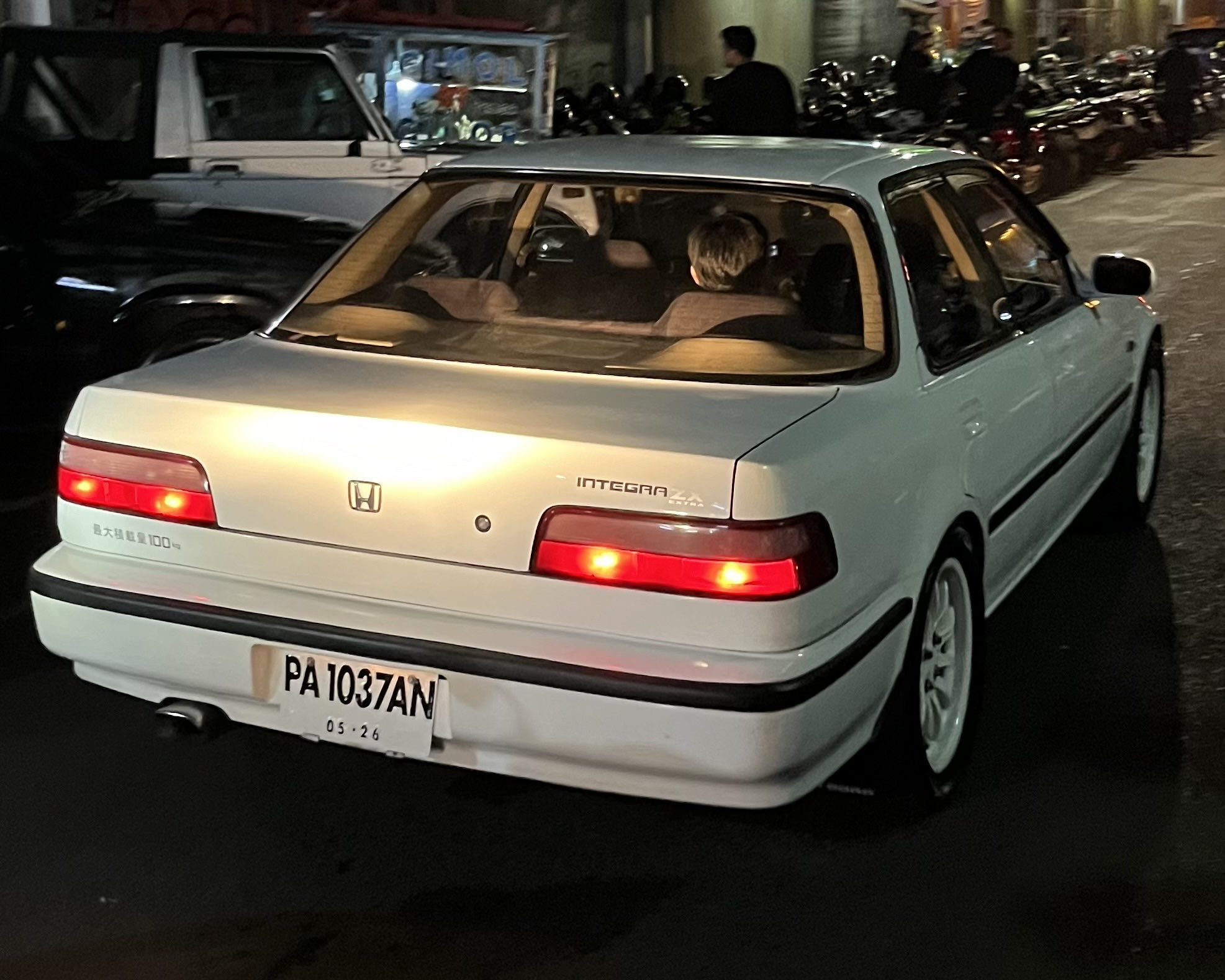
Honda Integra with PA plate

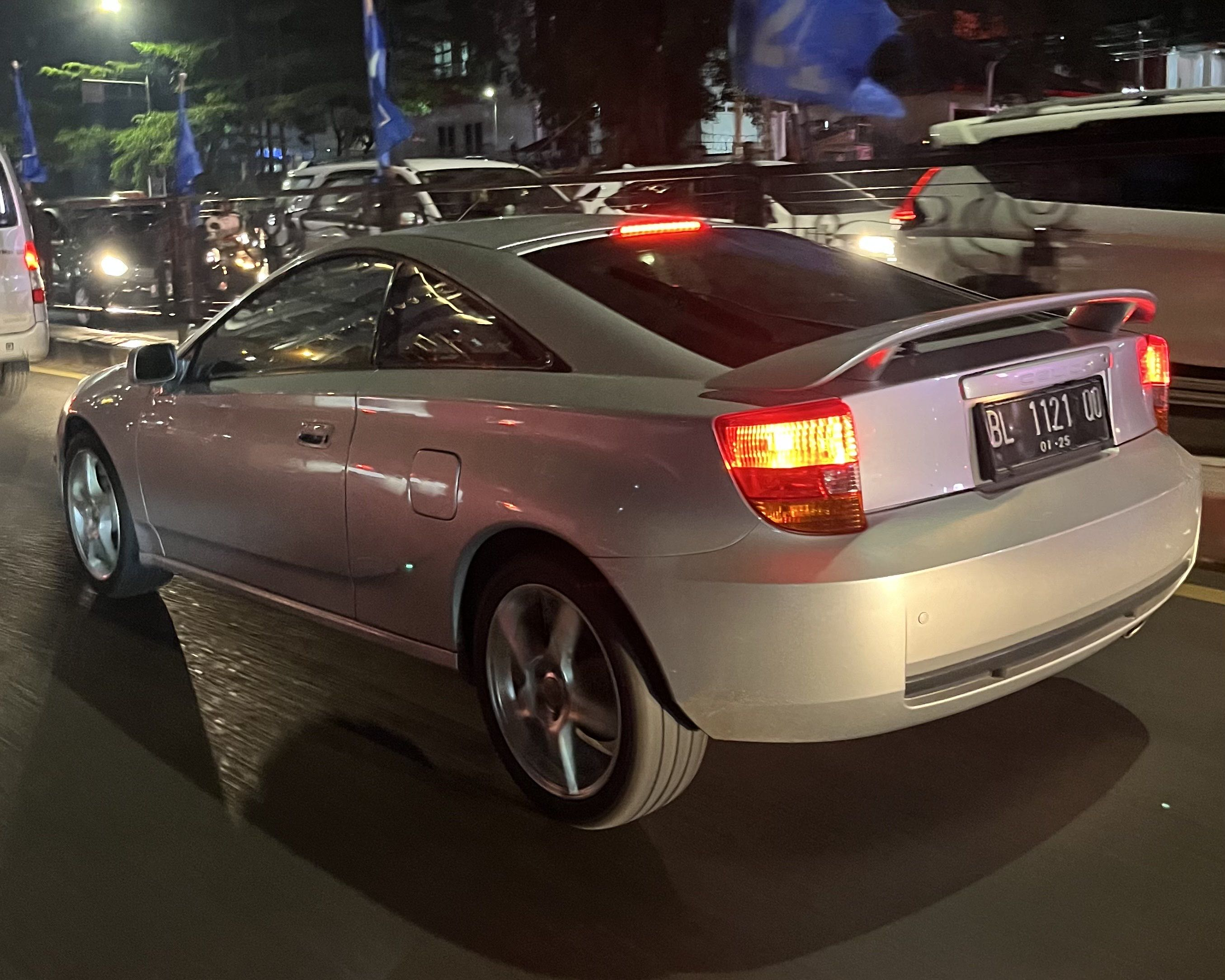
Toyota Celica with BL plate

From 2007 to 2015, used cars gradually became harder to import until their import was banned completely. Some used cars in Sabang and Papua are able to be moved outside the area through loopholes, explaining why some exotic cars use BL and PA registration plates.

More limitations were also placed on importing spare parts. Such parts must have a recondition certificate. Half-cut imports are therefore not possible. Some motorcycles are imported half-cut through some a loophole in the law, but cannot obtain a title; there is thus a large demand for no-paper motorcycles.

==== Present ====
For now, only new cars less than two years from manufacture can be imported to Indonesia. Passenger car imports can be taxed up to 125% of the car's price, leading to a lower demand for grey import cars.

The currently most commonly imported cars are the Toyota Vellfire, Toyota Land Cruiser Prado, Land Rover Defender, and many variants of Kei cars.

There are no rules regarding left-hand drive cars. However, left-hand drive does not meet the Indonesian National Standard, in short; they are legal to import but not legal to be sold officially. The most popular left-hand drive cars in Indonesia are the GMC Yukon and Cadillac Escalade.

Other means to obtain imported cars legally are through confiscated item auctions, or as ex-embassy cars; this creates a rarely used loophole to obtain classic cars. Some people import cars illegally in order for them to be confiscated and later auctioned, with the auction itself won by the importers.

==== Batam area ====
Currently, only the Batam area is subjected to tax-free import of cars, making it the largest market for grey imports in Indonesia. These tax-free cars are considered free trade zone (FTZ) cars with special green license plates. FTZ cars can only be driven in the Batam and Bintan areas. Unpaid tax must be paid to bring such cars to other parts of Indonesia.

=== Philippines ===
In the Philippines, the main source of import grey market vehicles, both passenger and commercial, is Japan. Second is Korea, third is the US via trans-shipments through Japan. Only one port, Port Irene, Cagayan, was open to grey market passenger vehicles between 2008 and 2014. Some dispute over the legality of importation of passenger vehicles arose and led to a Port Irene ban. Currently the Executive Order 418 has been upheld, thus banning the importation of used passenger vehicles into the Philippines.

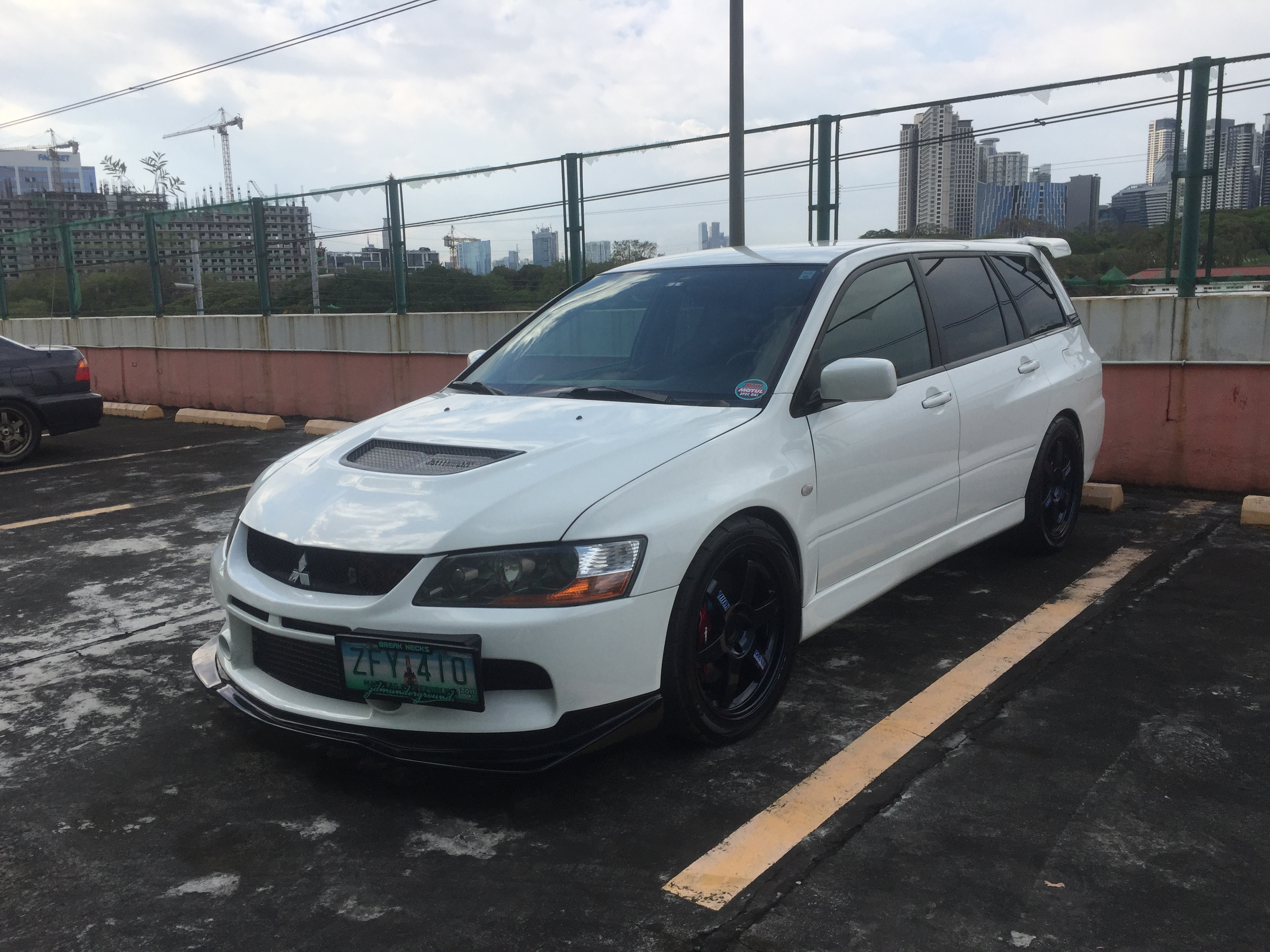
Mitsubishi Lancer Evolution Wagon MR Philippines grey import vehicle

Commercial vehicles, special purpose vehicles are not under EO 418 and thus are currently being imported into Subic and Poro Point, San Fernando. Subic sees roughly 1 cargo ship per week, and has many licensed locators. A second port, Poro Point is, as of February 2014, once per month and is solely facilitated by Forerunner Multi-Resources as the licensed locator, and SASTRAD KK in Japan as the sole shipper.

There is a grey-area trade of used mini trucks from Japan flourishing in Cebu. Mini trucks are chopped in Japan, imported as "parts" and are re-assembled by welding chassis parts together. Cheap to buy, they are a staple of small businesses transporting goods.

=== Japan ===
In Japan, although the laws against grey import products were strict, and domestic car makers and authorized dealers have to conform the vehicle dimension standards and other various regulations differing from Europe and United States, the laws against grey-imported vehicles are very lax due to absence of import tariffs, and there are some grey imported vehicles that were never officially sold in the Japanese domestic market. These ranging from small city cars like Toyota Aygo and Smart ForTwo, to sports cars like AC Cobra and Chevrolet Camaro, to commercial vehicles and pickup trucks like the Toyota Tundra. Most cars were imported from their country of origin, and a few were converted to RHD, though some were later introduced to authorized dealers due to popular demand.

Some grey market importers have tried to import domestically made export-only cars, such as the Subaru BRAT, Lexus GX (1st, 2nd gen and facelifts), early generations of the Lexus LX (before the official arrival in 2015), 1st generation Lexus LM, Nissan Patrol (Y62), Infiniti QX80, Mazda CX-70, Mazda CX-90, Toyota 4Runner (after the model was discontinued in Japan in 2009, the 5th and 6th gen 4Runners were North America-only), Toyota T100, and Infiniti FX, back into Japan's grey market. In Japan, the term used to refer to this scene is Gyakuyunyū (逆輸入; literally "Reverse import", commonly shortened to "reimport"), and this mainly applies to Japanese-branded vehicles. Also, due to NOx laws and some other differing regulations, pickup trucks like the Toyota Hilux are no longer officially distributed in the JDM, so importers continue to import foreign-built trucks into Japan.

The concept of Gyakuyunyū is referenced in the titles of the Ringo Sheena albums Gyakuyunyū: Kōwankyoku and Gyakuyunyū: Kōkūkyoku.

In Japan, foreign cars sold locally have traditionally been LHD, which is regarded as exotic or a status symbol. This even applies to British brands (although cars for the British market have the steering wheel on the right), in part because many have been imported via the US. Many tollbooths in Japan have a special lane for LHD vehicles. However, some American manufacturers have made RHD models for the Japanese market (such as the Ford Taurus, Saturn S-Series, and Chevrolet Cavalier), though with limited success; and as continental European brands become more popular, the preference is increasingly for RHD models, many of which are re-exported to countries like New Zealand as grey imports, along with Japanese models.

=== Sweden ===
In Sweden, the main source of grey market vehicles is via Germany, which has more liberal laws and better tax deals on new imported cars. Many used cars also come from Germany, which has a bigger domestic market and rigorous roadworthiness tests. There are no age restrictions on imported vehicles, as such.

=== Thailand ===
In Thailand, most grey imports are expensive, rare, and/or sports cars. Most are right-hand drive cars from the United Kingdom, Japan, Malaysia, or Hong Kong, though some are brought in from the US (as left-hand drive cars).

Mercedes-Benz Thailand, an authorized distributor, does exist, but many Mercedes-Benz cars are imported and sold by grey importers. As of 2011, Mercedes-Benz Thailand has a new policy of not providing warranty work to grey-market imports.

The new Thai law prohibits the importation of used cars, effective on December 10, 2019.

=== Trinidad and Tobago ===
In Trinidad and Tobago, nearly all used imports come from Japan, with some vehicles coming from Thailand and Singapore. Before February 2016, cars under 6 years old could be legally imported. Since February 2016, no car can be imported and registered if over 4 years old. An import licence is required and most imports are through dealerships. No new importer dealerships are permitted.

=== Senegal ===
Grey imports from France are generally being most common in Senegal. There are also grey imports from Spain, especially vehicles formerly being owned by their taxi companies, though some are brought in from Italy or even Belgium.

=== Slovakia ===
Grey import in Slovakia exists in some ways. As part of the EU, importing vehicles from member states is not restricted at all, although imported vehicle has to be inspected for origin (VIN number manipulation, possible stolen vehicle legalization) Main destinations for import are Germany, Austria, Italy, and the Czech Republic.

Imports from non-member EU states are restricted by age. Personal vehicles are restricted to 8 years (from date of first registration to date of customs declaration), and vehicles intended to be used for business are restricted to 5 years. Vehicles imported from non-member states which are not approved for European roads have to pass import inspection, and modified to meet restrictions. For vehicles from the U.S. or Canada it is mandatory to change headlights, or adjust them for the EU bulb pattern, change red rear turn signals to orange ones, separate them from brake wiring, and add fog lights. Importing cars with RHD has been allowed from 20 May 2018, but the headlights and fog lights have to be converted to the continental pattern.

=== Pakistan ===
Grey imports in Pakistan do exist; however, it is limited by passenger cars no older than 3 years old and 4x4 jeeps or off-road passenger vehicles no older than 5 years old at the time of arrival in the Port of Entry. There could be a significant saving on luxury cars in Pakistan, as the official dealer channels may be excessive in price, and also the used car markets may also be excessive in price.

The Federal Board of Revenue for Pakistan gives the importer three scenarios which a passenger vehicle could be imported into the country. These scenarios are as follows:

- Personal Baggage scheme
- Transfer of Residence scheme
- Gift scheme

The Pakistan Customs Duty rates of imports, providing that the vehicles (excluding jeeps) meet the age requirements for Pakistan, are shown below:

- Up to 800 CC (other than US$6,600 Asian Makes);
- From 801 CC to 1000 CC US$5,500
- From 1001 CC to 1300 CC US$11,000
- From 1301 CC to 1500 CC US$15,400
- From 1501 CC to 1600 CC US$18,700
- From 1601 CC to 1800 CC US$23,100

In 2018, after years of appealing with the Pakistan Government, the Classic Car Club of Pakistan was delighted to announce that the Pakistan Government has finally allowed the importation of classic vehicles. The Express Tribune of Pakistan reported on the subject by stating;

"...Earlier in the budget announcement for fiscal year 2018–19 at the end of April, the government had said that it would impose a flat duty of $5,000 on the import of vintage or classic cars and jeeps. A formal notification was issued by the FBR on July 3..."

“...The federal government is pleased to exempt vintage or classic cars and jeeps meant for transport of persons on the import thereof from customs duty, regulatory duty, additional customs duty, federal excise duty, sales tax and withholding tax as are in excess of the cumulative amount of US dollars five thousand per unit,” said the FBR notification.

The duties have been exempted in exercise of the powers of the Customs Act 1969, Federal Excise Act 2005 and Sales Tax Act. However, it clarified that vintage or classic cars and jeeps mean old and used automotive vehicles, falling under PCT Code 87.03 of the First Schedule to the Customs Act 1969 (IV of 1969), manufactured prior to January 1, 1968. APP..."

=== Greece ===
Grey imports do exist in Greece. However, they are rare, expensive, and are limited. Small and medium vehicles must be new and not more than 15 days old; buses, vans, and heavy vehicles cannot be more than 25 days old, and vehicles have to be left-hand drive before arrival in Greece. Vehicles from left-hand traffic countries must be at least three years old, have to be converted to left-hand drive, and must be inspected before arrival.

The majority of grey imported vehicles originate from either Germany, Netherlands and France, and is a beneficial method of purchasing any (maybe unusual) vehicle in a much better condition and better vehicle history record. In an attempt to reduce the carbon footprint of older vehicles, the Ministry of Energy and Environment announced environmental tax measures prohibiting the import of vehicles that meet Euro III (or lower) standards.

- For Euro IV vehicles, the importer has to pay a fee of €3,000
- For Euro V vehicles, the importer has to pay a fee of €1,000
- For Euro VI vehicles, the importer does not pay any environmental fees upon importing

The only exception from the restrictions above is when an imported vehicle is over 30 years old and intended for historical use only.

In addition to the above costs, there is a vehicle registration fee which must be paid within 45 days (from the time of the declared arrival of the vehicle into the country until the 15th of the next month) in order to obtain Greek number plates. The registration fee is based on:

- The pre-tax retail price of the vehicle (at the time of its first registration)
- The vehicle's mileage
- The vehicle's age/month of first registration (in months)
- The factory claimed CO_{2} emissions of the vehicle
- The European emission standards the vehicle is classified for (at the time of its first registration)
- The vehicle's type (e.g. hatchback, estate, SUV etc.)
- How the vehicle is powered (hybrid vehicles are subject to half of the fee, whereas fully electric vehicles are exempt from any registration fees)
- The status of the new owner of the vehicle (if they are disabled or parents of at least three minor children, they are exempt from any registration fees, but future resale is restricted to people with multi-member families or disabilities, respectively)

The declaration of arrival is submitted either electronically or upon arrival in the country (either through the respective border control or the destination's customs office).

=== Cambodia ===
Used cars in Cambodia are mainly imported from Taiwan, United States, Russia, Japan, South Korea and the GCC countries (mostly UAE). Used vehicles from Germany and also the Netherlands are rarely imported there due to the lack of port cities and also due to troubled and highly problematic cost of delivery.

=== Singapore ===
As of 2019, the Land Transport Authority mandates that vehicles imported into Singaporean soil must be brand new or manufactured at most three years ago.

=== Armenia ===
Used cars in Armenia are mainly imported from Japan, Singapore and the United States. There are also used cars from European countries, but they are mostly over 15 years old.

=== Kyrgyzstan ===
In Kyrgyzstan, grey imports of used cars from Japan and the United States are generally most common. Used cars from European countries are predominantly more than 15 years old and mostly limited to German car brands.

=== Suriname ===
Grey imports from Japan and Singapore are generally the most common in Suriname. LHD vehicles are also allowed on the road, but importation of LHD vehicles (especially from the US) is prohibited. Used vehicles from the United Kingdom, Republic of Ireland, Australia and New Zealand are rarely imported there.

Most of the privately owned buses are imported from Japan, since they are already RHD. Most state-owned buses, however, are from the US and the doors have to be repositioned.

=== Myanmar ===
In spite of the change to driving on the right, most passenger cars in the country today are right-hand drive, being second-hand vehicles imported from Japan, Thailand, and Singapore. Now, only left-hand drive can be imported to Myanmar. The reasoning is right-hand drive cars are unsuitable for Myanmar's road traffic system.

=== Caribbean ===
In many Caribbean islands where traffic drives on the left, such as the British Virgin Islands, U.S. Virgin Islands, the Cayman Islands, the Bahamas and Turks and Caicos Islands, most passenger cars are LHD, being imported from the United States or even Korea. Only government cars, buses and vehicles imported from Japan are RHD. The US Virgin Islands (originally a Danish protectorate which drove on the left, as did Denmark until the early 20th century) are particularly notorious for a high accident rate caused by American tourists from the mainland who are unfamiliar with driving on the left in their rental cars – the confusion from which is obviously compounded by using a LHD vehicle.

== See also ==
- Grey market
- Parallel import
- Japanese used vehicle exporting
- Katrina car
