= Vehicle inspection in Australia =

Vehicle inspection in Australia is generally done on a state basis (with the exception of Federally Registered Heavy Vehicles, see below). Each state or territory has the authority to set its own laws pertaining to vehicle inspections, all (with the exception of the self-governing territory of Norfolk Island) have some form of inspection, either periodically or before a transfer of ownership.

== Australian Capital Territory ==
Vehicles in the following categories must be inspected by an authorised vehicle examiner:

- When registering a brand new vehicle for the first time (usually the dealer does this prior to delivery)
- Upon transfer of ownership if the vehicle is over six years old
- Before transferring a registration from interstate regardless of the vehicle's age
- Before re-registering a vehicle if the previous registration was canceled or expired more than 12 months ago
- If a defect notice is issued

Once a vehicle is registered, it generally will not need to be inspected again if it remains with the same owner. However, the Australian Capital Territory has a random inspection scheme, vehicles can be spot checked whether occupied or not. If faults are discovered, a defect notice can be issued in which case the owner will be required to have repairs made, and obtain a full inspection from a licensed examiner with 14 days to clear the notice. If egregious safety violations are found, the vehicle's registration can be suspended on the spot and the operator will need to have the vehicle towed.

Vehicles powered by natural gas or propane must receive a special annual gas inspection.

== New South Wales ==
Vehicles over five years old are required to obtain an e-Safety Check prior to annual registration renewal or before transferring a registration from interstate. This was previously known as a "Pink Slip", and the term is still used colloquially.

== Northern Territory ==
Vehicle Roadworthy Inspections for light vehicles (<4.5 ton GVM/ATM) are required once the vehicle is 5 years old, 10 years old, then annually. Vehicles 5 years or older, seeking registration in the NT for the first time require a Roadworthy Inspection. All vehicles over 10 years old require a roadworthy inspection every year.

== Queensland ==
Queensland Transport requires any vehicle to have a safety inspection (and the resulting Safety Certificate prominently displayed) before it can be offered for sale or have its interstate registration transferred. The inspection checks the general condition of the vehicle itself (suspension, body condition, etc...) and certain items of basic safety equipment such as the tyres, brakes, lights, windshield, etc... The certificate is valid for 1,000 km or 3 months (whichever is sooner) if the vehicle is being offered for sale by a dealer, and for 2,000 km or 2 months if being sold by an individual. There are some exceptions, vehicles being sold in rural parts of the state are exempt if driving to the nearest inspection station would present a hardship, and vehicles that are only being sold for parts likewise do not require a safety inspection. Sellers who are required to have a safety certificate but either do not obtain one or fail to display it properly while the vehicle is advertised for sale are subject to a $500 on the spot fine.

There are no periodic safety inspections in Queensland once a vehicle is registered, however, mobile road teams conduct random emissions inspections through a program called OVERT, and drivers may be summoned if their vehicles are not within legal guidelines or emits visible smoke.

Vehicles may also be targeted as a group, with Sting operations being conducted by Queensland Police Service, such as "Operation Lift", which targeted recreational Four-Wheel-Drive vehicles that had been extensively modified.

== South Australia ==
The majority of privately owned vehicles do not need to be inspected to be legally driven or have their interstate registration transferred to South Australia. Vehicles with certain types of modifications, specifically engine, chassis, wheel-base, seating capacity, brakes, steering, or suspension modifications require a certificate of roadworthiness prior to registration (or as a condition of continued registration). Additionally, several other categories of vehicles also require a certificate:

- Vehicles cited for safety faults by the police.
- Vehicles that were previously written off and/or salvaged.
- Rebuilt, self-constructed or homemade vehicles (such as classic car restorations or kit cars)
- Vehicles transferred from interstate that are over seven years old and weigh more than 4.5 tonnes (10,000 lbs).
- Vehicles that were transferred from left-hand to right-hand drive.
- Buses with a seating capacity of 13 persons or more

== Tasmania ==
A safety inspection is required for:

- Transferring a mainland (interstate) registration to Tasmania
- Re-registering a vehicle whose previous registration expired or was cancelled more than three months ago
- Re-registering a vehicle that was written off and repaired
- Registering a vehicle converted from left-hand to right-hand drive

== Victoria ==
Similar to Queensland, VicRoads requires that a vehicle being sold, registered from interstate have a current Certificate of Roadworthiness from a licensed vehicle inspector. Additionally, vehicles that are cited by the police for safety defects must also obtain a certificate.

Victoria does not require an inspection upon transfer of an interstate registration if the vehicle remains with the same owner.

== Western Australia ==
A vehicle inspection is required before a vehicle can be registered for the first time, after a lapse in registration, if a vehicle has received certain modifications, or has been cited for safety faults (a "yellow sticker") by the police. Certain commercial and public transport vehicles must be inspected annually.

== Heavy Vehicles ==
Heavy Vehicles in Australia are governed by the Heavy Vehicle National Law which is enforced by the National Heavy Vehicle Regulator

Heavy Vehicles in Australia come under the Heavy Vehicle (Registration) National Regulation and the Heavy Vehicle (Vehicle Standards) National Regulation

Whilst some vehicles may hold registration within their home state, vehicles that travel interstate can carry National Heavy Vehicle Registration, allowing them to operate in every state of Australia without concern to legalities to the setup of the vehicle.

== Modified and Home Built Vehicles ==
Each state in Australia generally has its own rules with regards to vehicle modifications. However, most states are in line utilising the Federal Framework of Vehicle Standards Bulletin 14, known by its alternative name of "National Code of Practice for Light Vehicle Modifications".

However, the state of Queensland uses the Queensland Code of Practice which differs slightly from the National Code of Practice.

Queensland is however slowly transitioning to the National Code of Practice as changes are required.

When a vehicle is modified, it is generally required to get inspections and certification done by what is known as an "Approved Person" to ensure that the modifications to the vehicle are safe to the operator, and that they will not cause a danger to pedestrians, other motorists, or emergency services as per the relevant Code of Practice.

Separate rules exist for the construction of what is known as an "Individually Constructed Vehicle"

Vehicles commonly in the category of Individually Constructed Vehicles include Kit Cars and Trailers

Light Trailers, are covered under Vehicle Standards Bulletin VSB1. This standard is applicable nationwide, with approval sought on a case-by-case basis for privately constructed trailers.

Primarily, focus on modifications is for categories of:

- Engine Modifications
- Transmission Modifications
- Brake Modifications
- Body Modifications
- Seating Modifications
- Fuel Systems
- Modifications to Older Vehicles
- Suspension and Steering
- Electric Vehicle Modifications, Including Conversions to Electric Drive

However special provisions are made for:

- Motorcycles
- Trikes

== See also ==
- Automobile safety
