= ICP srl =

Italian aircraft and automotive manufacturer

Coordinates: 45.0277268°N 7.9637570°E

- Company type: Privately held company
- Industry: Aerospace, automotive
- Founded: 1980
- Founder: Tancredi (Edi) Razzano
- Headquarters: Castelnuovo Don Bosco, Italy
- Products: Wiring harnesses, automotive brake wear indicators, kit aircraft
- Website: www.icp.it

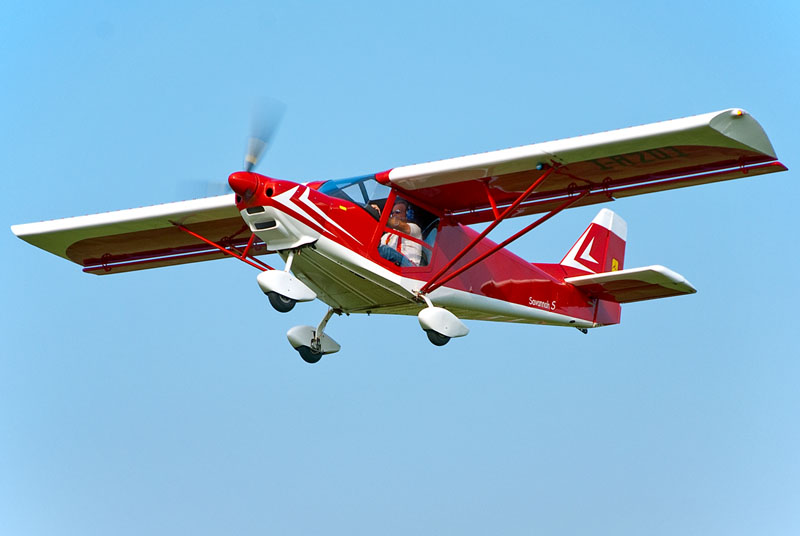
ICP Savannah S

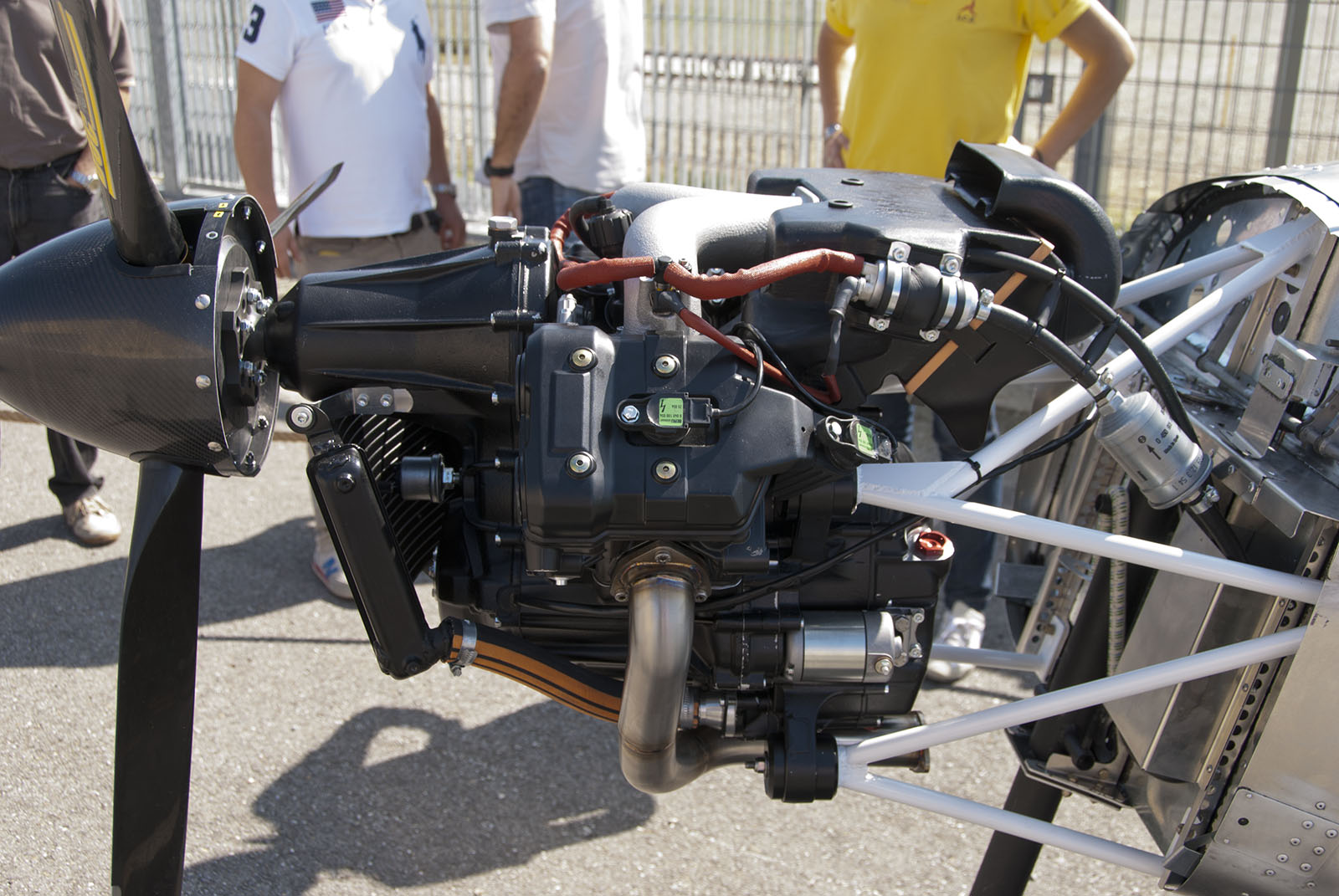
ICP M09 engine

ICP srl is an Italian wiring harness, automotive brake wear indicator and aircraft manufacturer founded by Tancredi (Edi) Razzano in 1980 and originally based in Piovà Massaia. The company relocated to Castelnuovo Don Bosco in Piedmont on 10 September 2009. ICP specializes in the design and manufacture of kit aircraft for amateur construction.

== History ==
ICP was founded in 1980 to produce wiring harnesses for the automotive, electromechanical and domestic appliance markets. In 1984 the company expanded into designing and producing wear indicators for disc and drum brakes for cars, industrial vehicles and motorcycles. The company provides wear indicators that are used by Alfa Romeo, Audi, Citroen, Chevrolet Corvette, Daf, Ferrari, Fiat, Iveco, Lamborghini, Lancia, Maserati, Peugeot, Renault and Volvo.

In the late 1990s Razzano decided to use the considerable investment he had made in CNC machining to produce kit aircraft, beginning with the ICP Bingo and Savannah aircraft. The use of the CNC machines allowed kits to be produced at low cost, making the company very competitive in the kit aircraft market.

On 15 January 2012, ICP announced a collaborative production effort with Zenair of Canada to produce the Zenair CH650 at their plant, under the designation CH650Ei. Even so, Zenith STOL CH 701 designer Chris Heintz considers the Savannah an unauthorized copy of his design.

ICP is currently developing an aviation engine, designated the ICP M09. The engine was designed by Franco Lambertini, previously with Moto Morini motorcycles. The M09 has no parts in common with other Lambertini motorcycle engines, but is a clean-sheet design for aviation use. The engine is a four stroke, two cylinder, four valve, 1,223 cc (75 cu in) powerplant that delivers 115 hp (86 kW) at 7000 rpm and is capable of inverted flight. The first flight on an ICP Savannah S was on 18 December 2014.

== Aircraft ==
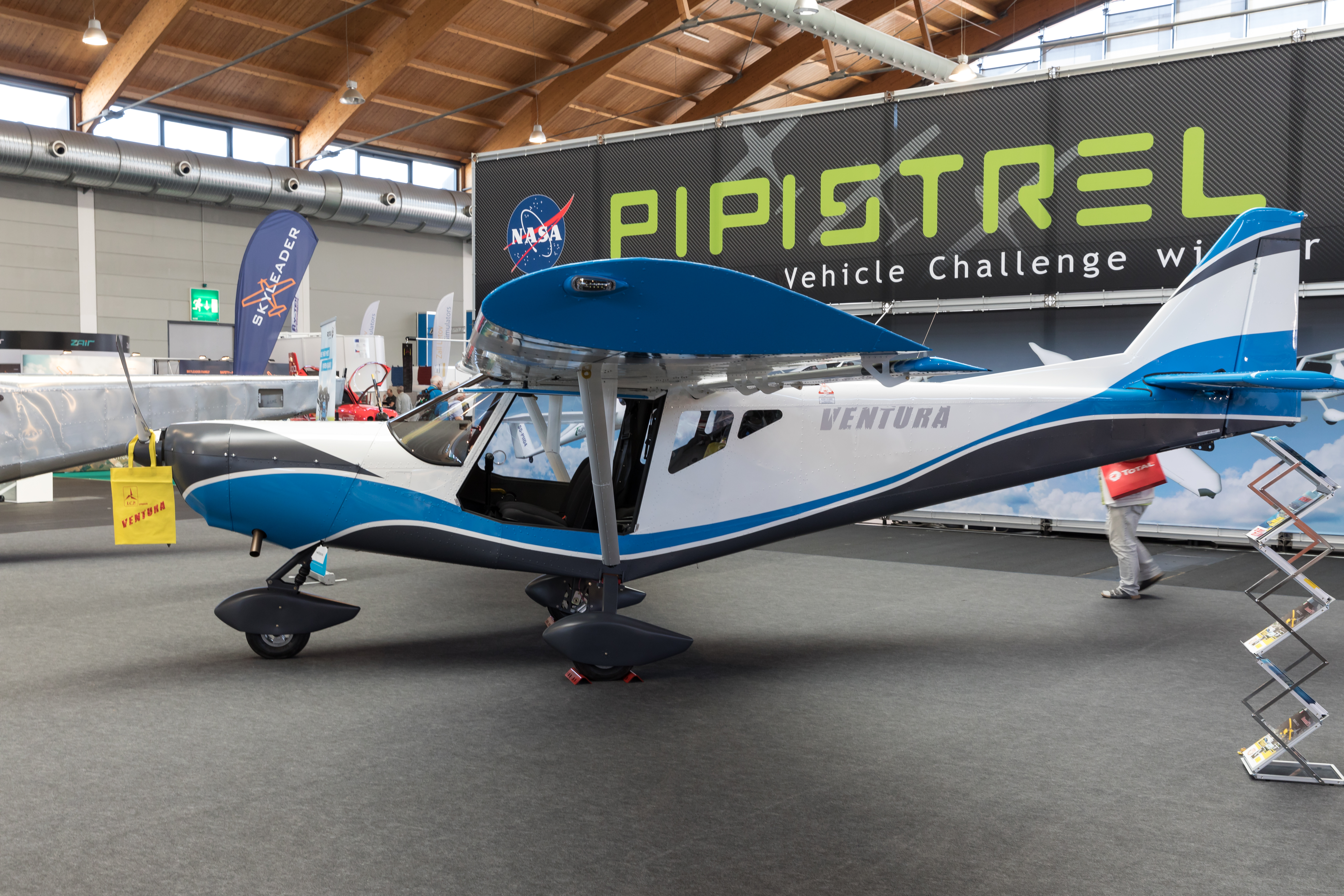
ICP Ventura

Summary of aircraft built by ICP
Model name	First flight	Number built	Type
ICP Amigo			Two seat, low wing, kit aircraft, production completed
ICP Bingo			Two seat, high wing, kit aircraft, variant of the Savannah
ICP Savannah		650	Two seat, high wing, kit aircraft
ICP Vimana	2006	at least 7	Two seat, high wing, kit aircraft
ICP Ventura			high wing
