= Ferodo =

British brake company

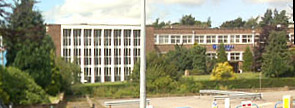
- Industry: Automotive
- Founded: 1897
- Founder: Herbert Frood
- Headquarters: Chapel-en-le-Frith, Derbyshire, England
- Products: Brakes
- Website: www.ferodo.co.uk

Ferodo is a British brake company based in Chapel-en-le-Frith in High Peak, Derbyshire.

== History ==
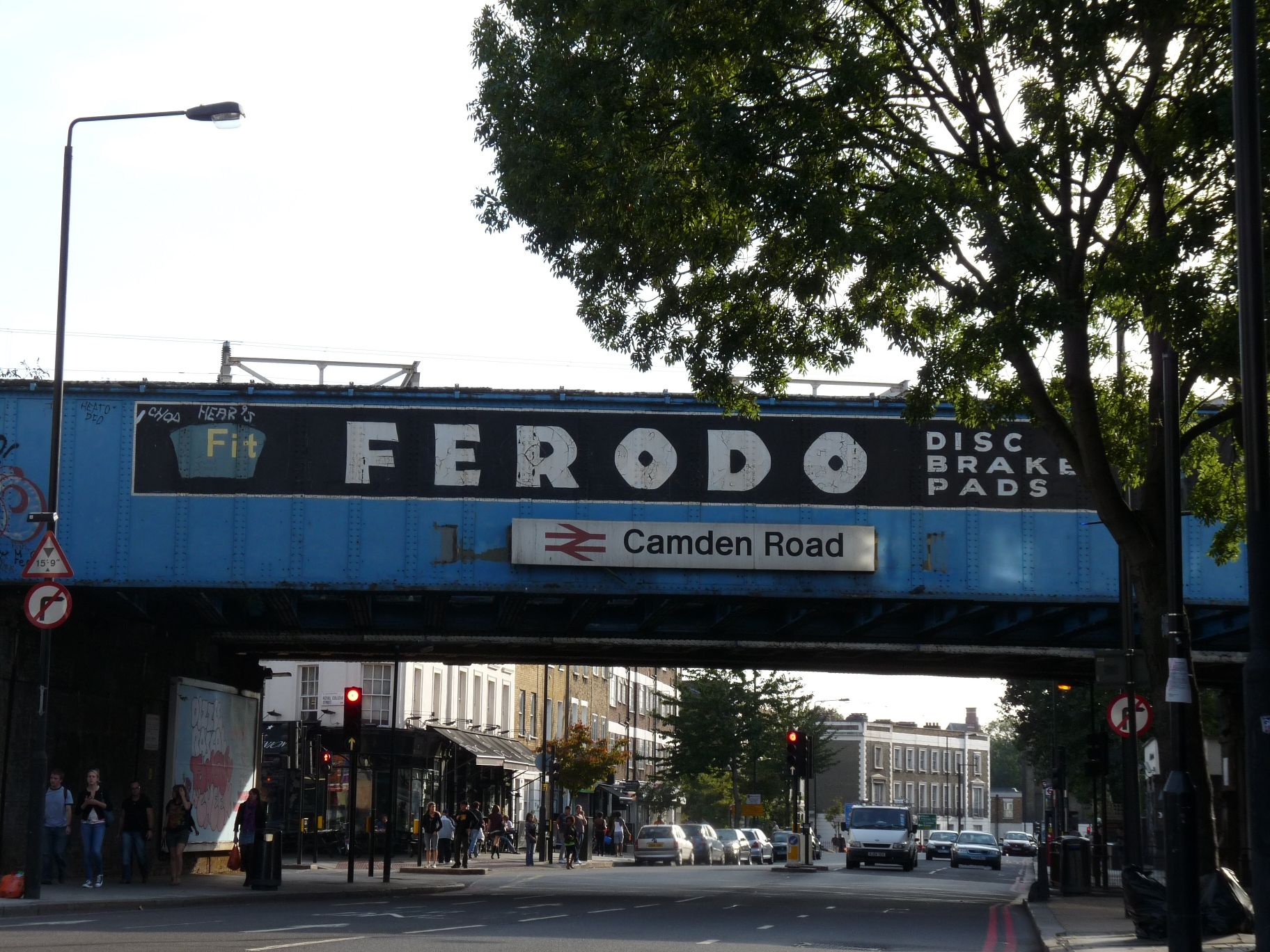
A Ferodo bridge at Camden Road railway station

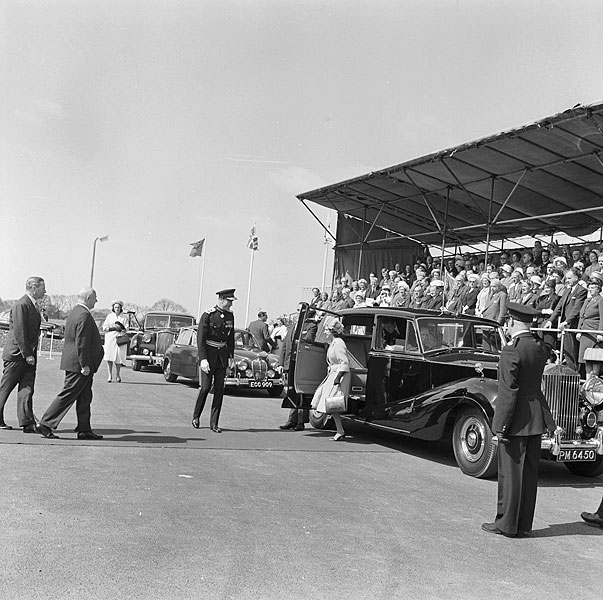
Ferodo's Caernarfon factory was opened by Princess Margaret in 1964

Ferodo was founded in 1897 by Herbert Frood (1864–1931), with manufacturing starting in Gorton in 1901 and moving to Chapel-en-le-Frith in 1902. Ferodo was the first company to use asbestos for brake linings and developed the first modern brake friction materials.

Ferodo UK became part of Turner & Newall in 1926. It had a factory at Chapel-en-le-Frith and in 1964 opened another at Caernarfon. In 1961, it merged its Australian operations with the brake lining division of James Hardie. In 1980, Turner & Newall sold its 40% shareholding in Ferodo-Hardie to James Hardie.

In 1998 Turner & Newall was acquired by the huge automotive group Federal-Mogul. In 2012, £13 million was invested in new floors, insulation, low energy heating and new process machines.

=== Visits ===
On 21 November 1958, Prince Philip, Duke of Edinburgh opened the £750,000 research centre, later visiting Chesterfield College of Technology.

== Asbestos trust ==
Federal-Mogul got into financial difficulties and filed for Chapter 11 protection as a result of asbestosis claims. In the United Kingdom the business went into administration in October 2001, leaving a pension fund deficit estimated at £400 million.

The T&N Subfund of the Federal-Mogul Asbestos Trust was organized to pay all valid Asbestos Trust claims for which the T&N Entities have legal responsibility. The Trust was created December 27, 2007 as a result of the confirmation of The Federal-Mogul Chapter 11 Joint Plan of Reorganization.

For claimants whose principal exposure to asbestos was in the United Kingdom or one of several other non-US countries, a UK Asbestos Trust was established to provide for the payment of asbestos claims in addition to the US-focused Asbestos Trust described above. This includes posthumous payments to families of Ferodo factory workers.

== Advertising ==
Ferodo is famous in Britain for advertising by having the Ferodo brand name painted on railway bridges over main roads. From 1968 until 1980, Hardie-Ferodo was the naming rights sponsor of the Bathurst 1000 in Australia.
