= Herbert Frood =

English inventor, industrialist, and entrepreneur (1864–1931)

- Born: 1864; Doncaster, West Riding of Yorkshire, England
- Died: 1 May 1931 (aged 66–67); England
- Citizenship: England
- Occupations: inventor, industrialist, and entrepreneur
- Known for: Inventing brake pads

Herbert Frood (1864 - 1 May 1931) was an English inventor, industrialist, and entrepreneur. He is known for being the inventor of brake pads.

== Early life ==
Frood was born in Doncaster, a town in the West Riding of Yorkshire, where he grew up. He was the oldest of four children. His father was Charles Trefusis Frood, born on 1 December 1827 in Surrey. Herbert Frood's training was not in engineering.

== Career ==
Frood started the Herbert Frood Company in around 1905, having started in the engineering business in 1897. His company developed friction surfaces for vehicle braking systems.

=== Ferodo ===
Whereas other inventors concentrated on the means of placing pressure on the vehicle wheel in the braking system, Frood was one of the few to simply look at the type of material being used for contacting the wheel's surface - a more efficient frictional surface. He developed better brakes because of the inadequacies of (primitive) shoe brakes on the Derbyshire hills. After the success of his invention, Frood started a new company called Ferodo (based on the letters of his name, with an additional "E" which was his wife’s initial (Elizabeth).

His invention initially used solid woven cotton impregnated with natural resins for brake pads (friction linings). Later phenol formaldehyde resins were used.

Frood became Joint Managing Director of Ferodo with William Horrocks. On 21 January 1920, Ferodo Ltd. was floated on the London Stock Exchange. Frood retired in 1927.

== Personal life ==
In September 1918, Herbert Frood bought the well-known Cat and Fiddle Inn (the second-highest pub in England, next to the source of the River Mersey near Shining Tor). The pub was in danger of being closed, and Frood planned to build a garage next to the pub.

Frood was married twice. He had two daughters from his first marriage in 1893. He was married again on 21 April 1926 at Woodford church in Cheshire, by the vicar of Poynton. From this marriage he had three children; a daughter Nida (b. November 1927), a son Herbert (b. 1930), and another daughter, Margaret born in 1931. He initially lived with his family on Manchester Road in Buxton, although later put their house up for sale a few months after the marriage.

Frood died in May 1931, at the age of 67. His second wife died on 21 October 1943 at the age of 48. His son Herbert married in Liverpool in 1959, and died in Cheshire in 1999.
