= Brake lining =

Consumable surfaces in brake systems

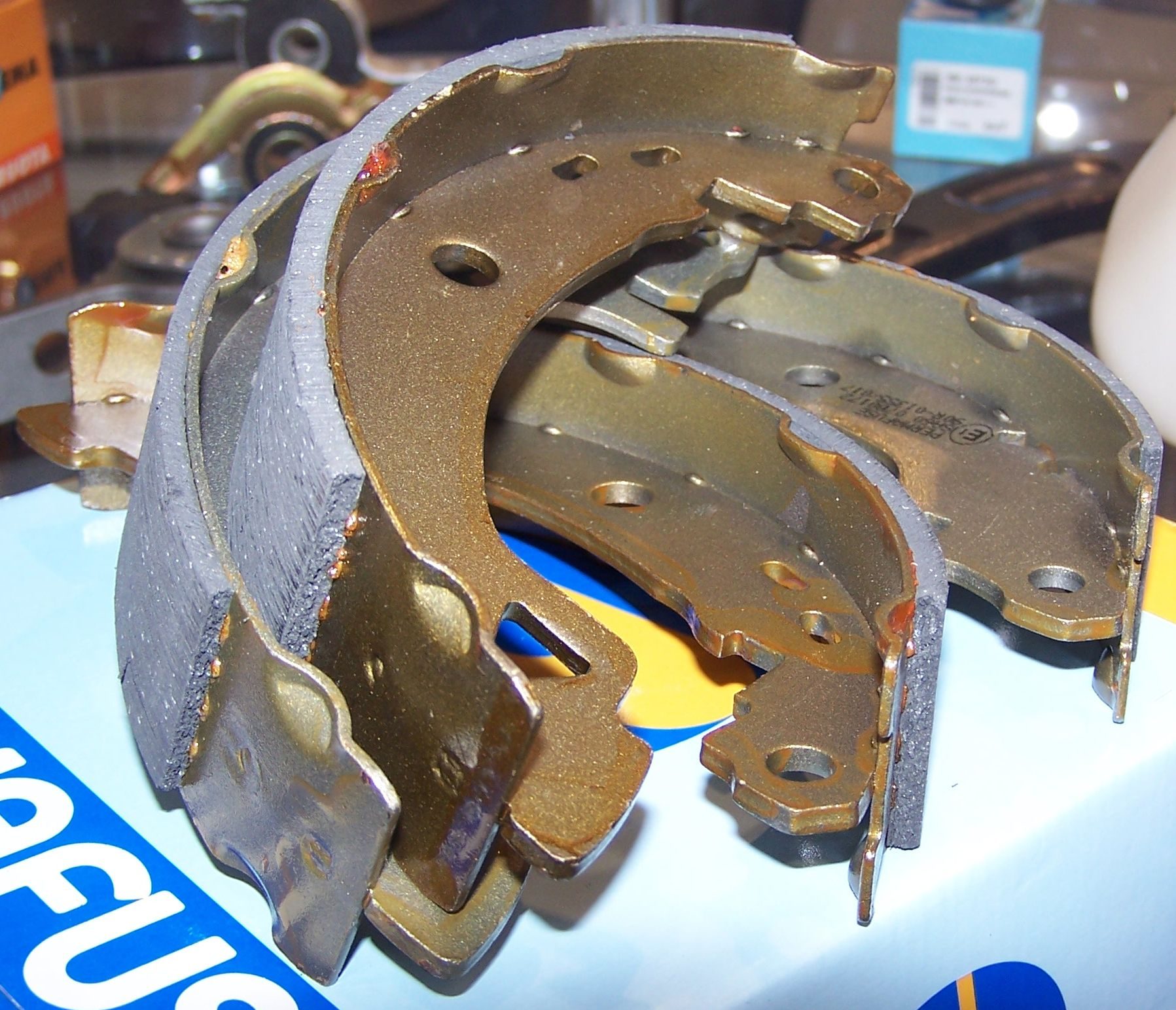
Drum shoes with linings

Brake linings are the consumable surfaces in brake systems, such as drum brakes and disc brakes used in transport vehicles.

== History ==
Brake linings were invented by Bertha Benz (the wife of Karl Benz, who invented the first patented automobile) during her long-distance car trip, the first in the world, in August 1888, when she told a shoemaker to nail leather onto the brake blocks. The first asbestos brake linings were developed in 1908 by Herbert Frood. Although Frood was the first to implement the use of asbestos brake linings, the heat dissipation properties of the fibres were tested by various scientists, including materials chemist Gwilym Price, who did most of his research and testing at Cambridge, United Kingdom, and various Cambridge-funded institutions.

== Structure and function ==
Brake linings are composed of a relatively soft but tough and heat-resistant material with a high coefficient of dynamic friction (and ideally an identical coefficient of static friction) typically mounted to a solid metal backing using high-temperature adhesives or rivets. The complete assembly (including lining and backing) is then often called a brake pad or brake shoe. The dynamic friction coefficient "μ" for most standard brake pads is usually in the range of 0.35 to 0.42. This means that a force of 1000 Newtons on the pad will give a resulting brake force close to 400 Newtons. There are some racing pads that have a very high μ of 0.55 to 0.62 with excellent high-temperature behaviour. These pads have high iron content and will usually outperform any other pad used with iron discs. Though these high μ pads wear themselves and the discs down more quickly, they are nevertheless a good cost effective alternative to more exotic/expensive materials.

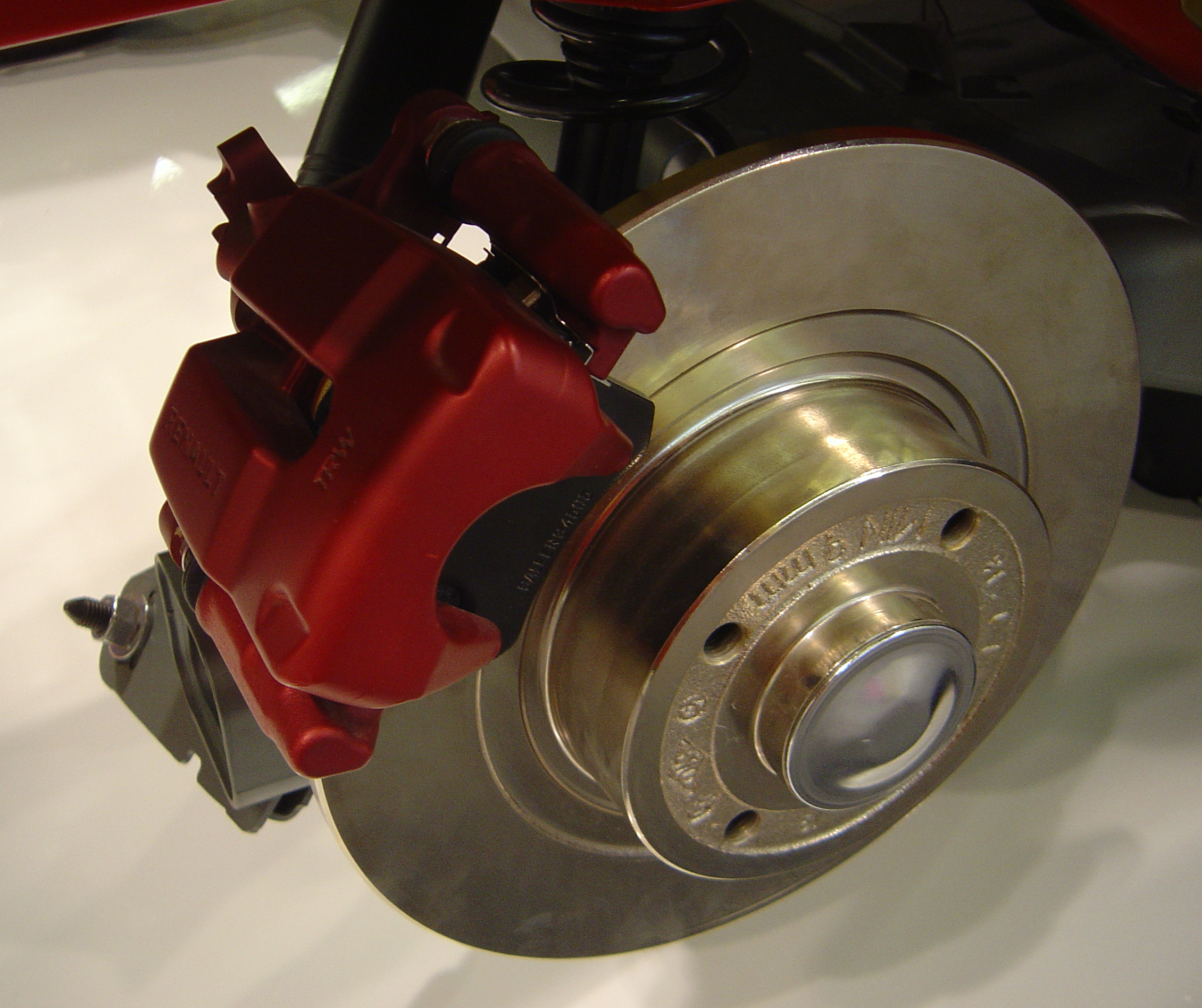
In this view of an automobile disc brake, the brake pad is the black material held by the red brake caliper. The brake lining is that part of the brake pad which actually contacts the metal brake disc (rotor) when the brake is engaged.

Using a typical bicycle brake as an example, the backing would be the metal shell which provides mechanical support, and the lining would be the rubbery portion which contacts the rims when the brakes are applied. In most modern vehicular applications the system is conceptually identical, except the rims would be replaced with solid steel (or sometimes exotic metal) disc. Furthermore, a metal tang is usually incorporated into the pad assembly. The tang contacts the rotors when the linings are worn out, causing an annoying noise designed to alert the motorist that brake servicing is required.

Since the lining is the portion of the braking system which converts the vehicle's kinetic energy into heat, the lining must be capable of surviving high temperatures without excessive wear (leading to frequent replacement) or outgassing (which causes brake fade, a decrease in the stopping power of the brake).

Due to its efficacy, chrysotile asbestos was often a component in brake linings. However, studies such as a 1989 National Institutes of Health item showed an uncommonly high proportion of brake mechanics were afflicted with pleural and peritoneal mesothelioma, both of which are linked to chrysotile and asbestos exposure. Public health authorities generally recommend against inhaling brake dust, chrysotile has been banned in many developed countries, such as Australia in late 2003, and chrysotile has been progressively replaced in most brake linings and pads by other fibers such as the synthetic aramids. Most countries in the world now prohibit the use of brake linings made of asbestos for the sake of people's health and environmental protection. Asbestos-free formulations are the choice for most people.

== Maintenance ==
When the lining is worn out, the backing or rivets will contact the rotors or drums during braking, often causing damage requiring re-machining or replacement of the drums or rotors. An annoying squeal caused by the warning tang is designed as a typical audible alert that the pads need to be replaced; some vehicles may also have electrical brake wear indicators. If the squeal or wear indicator is ignored for too long, drum or rotor damage (usually accompanied by an unpleasant grinding sound or sensation) together with degraded braking capacity will be the result.

The brake lining may also become contaminated by oil or leaked brake fluid. Typical symptoms will be brake chatter, where the pads vibrate as the lining grabs and releases the rotor's surface. The solution is to repair and clean the source of the contamination, replace the damaged pads and possibly also have the rotors re-skimmed or replaced if they are damaged.

In the automotive repair industry, consumers can purchase brake pads with a lifetime warranty. These pads use a much harder lining than traditional brake pads and tend to cause excessive wear of the much more expensive rotors or drums. For that reason, consumers should ensure that the new brake pads installed are those specified or supplied by the vehicle's manufacturer.

Brake pads should always be replaced in pairs on both sides of a vehicle, as the different lining thicknesses (and possibly material types) will cause uneven braking, making the vehicle pull in the direction of the more effective brake. For most vehicles, replacing pads (and therefore linings) is easy for a mechanic, requiring a minimum of tools and time — the linings are designed to be consumable and should therefore be easy to service.

Brake linings can also be found just about everywhere there are braking systems and clutches, from elevator safety brakes to spindle brakes inside a VCR. The form and materials are frequently different, but the principle is the same.

== Cataloguing ==
There are different systems for the cataloguing of brake linings. The most frequently used system in Europe is the WVA numbering system.

== See also ==
- List of auto parts
