= ICP M09 =

Italian aircraft engine

M09
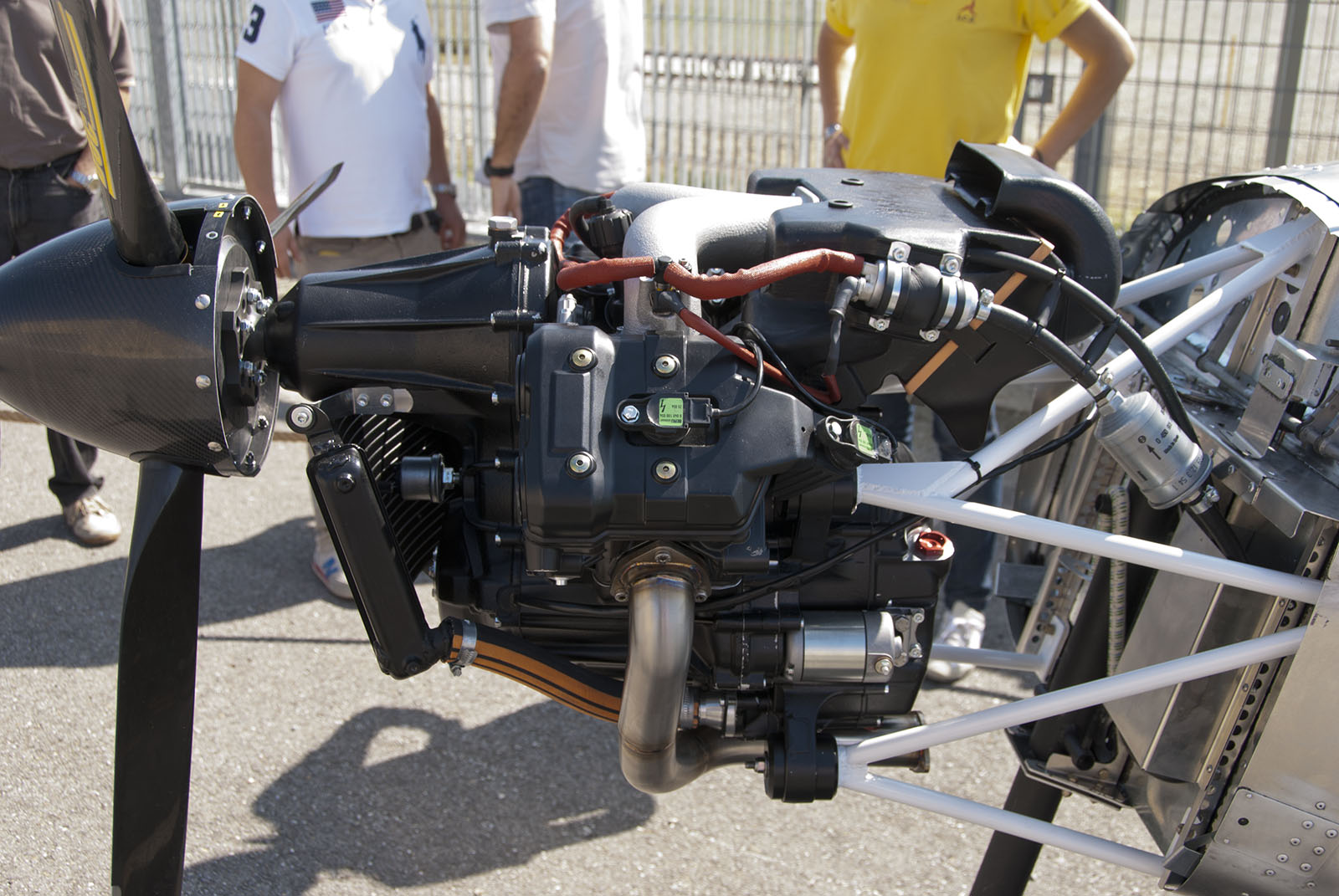
- Type: piston aircraft engine
- National origin: Italy
- Manufacturer: ICP srl
- Designer: Franco Lambertini
- First run: 2014

The ICP M09 is an Italian piston aircraft engine under development by ICP srl of Castelnuovo Don Bosco, Piedmont. The engine is intended for aircraft in the European Fédération Aéronautique Internationale microlight and the American light-sport aircraft categories.

== Design and development ==
Design work on the M09 started in about 2008 with work proceeding secretly until it was publicly announced in mid-September 2012. The design goals were compactness and quick installation.

The M09 was designed by Franco Lambertini, who previously designed Moto Morini motorcycle engines, although the engine has no commonality with other Lambertini motorcycle engines and is a clean-sheet design for aviation use.

The engine is a four stroke, 90° V twin cylinder, four valve, 1,225 cc (75 cu in) powerplant that delivers a maximum of 115 hp (86 kW) at 7000 rpm and is capable of inverted flight as well as tractor and pusher configuration installations. It is equipped with a 2.95-to-1 reduction gearbox and has a dry weight of 67 kg (147 lbs). It incorporates an automatic decompressor starter installed on the exhaust valve camshaft. Fuel is delivered via electronic fuel injection. Turbocharging is envisioned for some future versions.

The family of engines is expected to produce 80 to 150 hp (60 to 112 kW) when fully developed, although the initial version is expected to produce 115 hp (86 kW). On initial runs it produced 135 hp (101 kW)

The first flight on an ICP Savannah S test bed aircraft was on 18 December 2014.

== Specifications (M09) ==
Data from EAA and Volo Sportivo

=== General characteristics ===
- Type: twin cylinder, Four stroke piston aircraft engine
- Displacement: 1,225 cc (75 cu in)
- Dry weight: 67 kg (147 lbs) dry

=== Components ===
- Fuel system: electronic fuel injection
- Cooling system: air
- Reduction gear: 2.95-to-1 reduction gearbox

=== Performance ===
- Power output: 115 hp (86 kW)
