= ICP Savannah =

Ultralight aircraft manufactured in Italy

Savannah
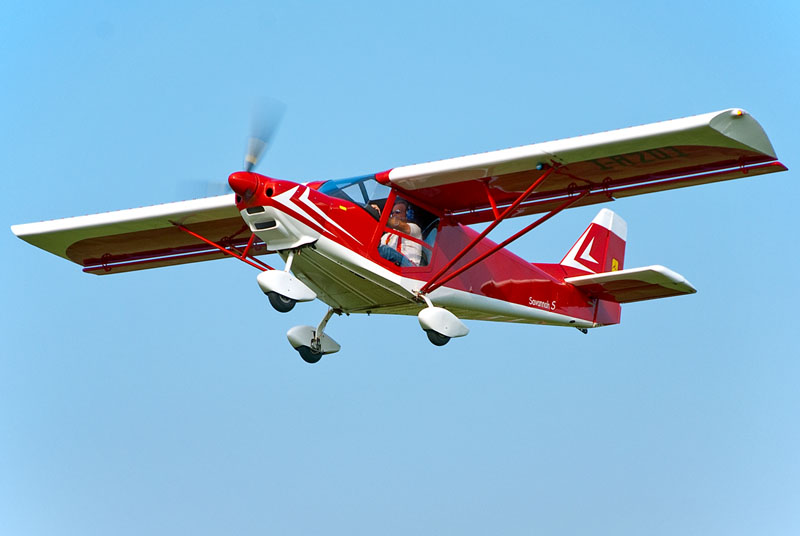

General information
- Type: Two seat ultralight
- National origin: Italy
- Manufacturer: ICP srl, Castelnuovo don Bosco
- Status: in production
- Number built: about 2000

The ICP Savannah is a high-wing, single-engine, ultralight with side-by-side seating for two produced in Italy by ICP srl. It has sold in large numbers, particularly in Europe. The Savannah is in production, sold in both kit and ready-to-fly form.

== Role ==
The Savannah is offered in ready-to-fly or kit form. It is commonly registered as a light-sport aircraft in the United States and as an ultralight in some other jurisdictions and is considered a microlight aircraft in New Zealand. Manufacture (both ready to fly and kits) is done in the ICP premises located in Castelnuovo Don Bosco (Piedmont, Italy), where the firm moved on September 10, 2009 from the original plant in Piovà Massaia.

Zenith STOL CH 701 designer, the late Chris Heintz, considered the Savannah an unauthorized copy of his design. Nevertheless, ICP and Zenair began a partnership in 2012 whereby ICP assembles the ready-to-fly version of the low wing Zenair 650Ei, an evolution of the AMD Zodiac, for the European market.

== Design ==
The Savannah is a two-seat aircraft of conventional configuration and metal semi-monocoque construction. The high wing is braced to the fuselage by V-struts. Most variants have a constant-chord wing with combined flaperons. Initial models were fitted with full-span leading edge slots. The cabin seats two side by side under the wing. Aft, the fuselage is flat-sided, with the underside rising towards the tail. The rectangular tailplane and elevators, which use a conventional airfoil unlike that of the Zenith, are set at the top of the fuselage, with the rudder running between the elevators to the keel. Fin and rudder are straight-tapered and slightly swept. The ICP factory may supply a rudder extension as an optional extra.

At the base of the wing support V-struts, the spatted mainwheels of the tricycle undercarriage are mounted on cantilever legs.The Savannah can be mounted on Kevlar/carbon fiber floats. An alternative floatplane version, using amphibious floats, was called the Savannah Hydro.

A variety of small engines in the 35–70 kW range have been fitted.

The Savannah Advanced has a shorter, tapered wing, with the wing slots replaced by vortex generators. The later XL version has a cabin with increased width and enhanced glazing.

== Operational history ==
Sales, beginning around 2000, had by 2010 reached 650 aircraft or kits. As of mid-2010 there have been about 513 Savannahs and Bingos on the registers of European countries west of Russia. Smaller numbers fly in North America, where the agents was Skykits Co., replaced in 2011 by I.C.P. Aviation North America, LLC (ICPANA), and elsewhere. In Australia and New Zealand, the 600 kg version of the Savannah XL and Savannah S are growing in popularity. As an example, as of March 2022 there are three types of Savannahs on the New Zealand aircraft register. This includes eight VG models, two XL models and 23 S models for a total of 33 Savannah aircraft. Currently, there are another seven S models under construction in New Zealand. In Australia, the best estimate is that there are in excess of 100 completed Savannahs flying; many more are under construction.

It is expected that the total number of ICP aircraft (all models, mainly Savannah and Bingo) produced exceeded 2,000 units by the end of 2011.

In 2008 an order from the Indian Air Force was expected.

== Variants ==
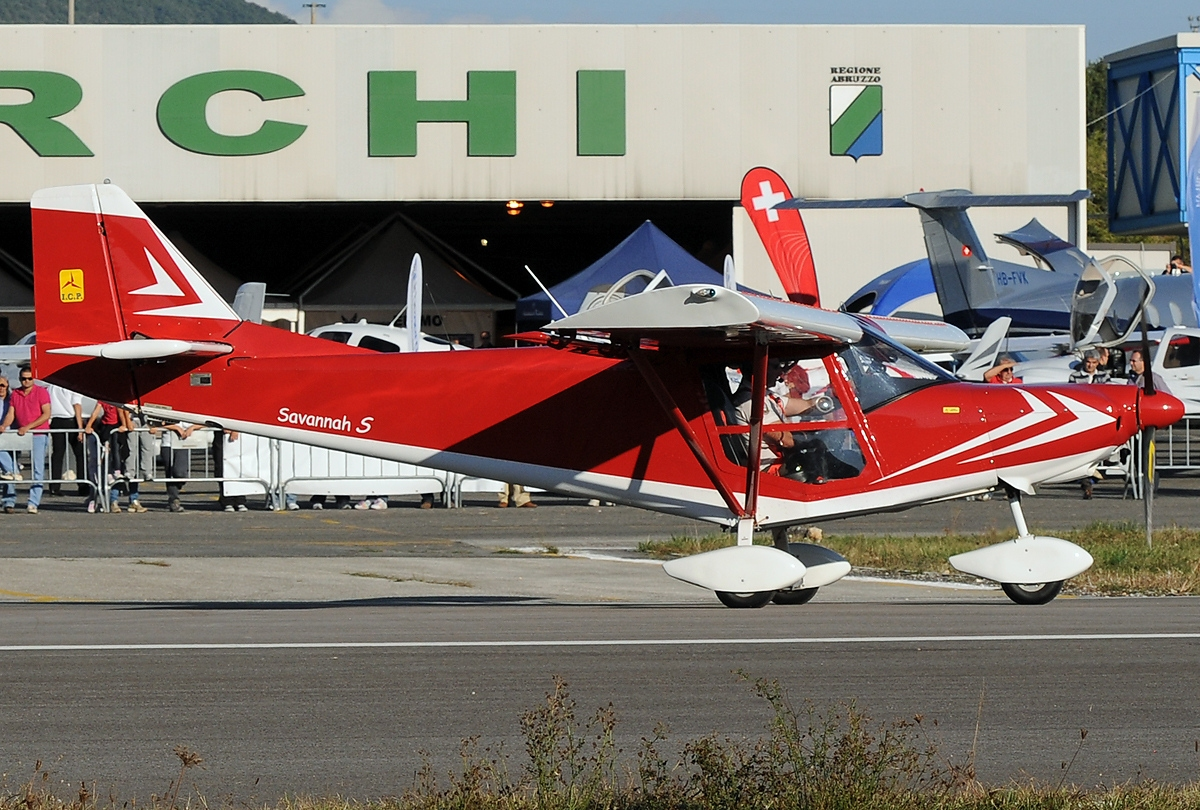
ICP Savannah

Data from Jane's All the World's Aircraft 2010/11

Savannah MXP-740 "Classic" with leading edge slats
Introduced in 1997. Production of the "Classic" model has ceased because leading edge slats are inefficient due additional drag; this aircraft is no longer available from ICP. This leaves the following Savannah variants in production in December 2020:
Bingo 503
37 kW (50 hp) two cylinder in line, two-stroke Rotax 503 engine.
Super Bingo
First flown 19 October 2001. 68 kW (92 hp) two cylinder in line, geared Simonini Victor 2 engine.
Bingo 4T
Introduced 2003. 45 kW (60 hp) two cylinder horizontally opposed four-stroke HKS 700E engine.
Vimana
Introduced 2006. Current production, 2011. Optimised for STOL performance, with the Savannah ADV wing with double-slotted Fowler flaps, leading edge slats, single bracing struts and a slimmer fuselage. Powered by the 74 kW (99 hp)) Rotax 912 ULS four-stroke engine. It is marketed in North America as the Rampage.
Savannah ADV
Model with redesigned tapered wing of 8.00 m (26.25 ft) span and 9.40 m^{2} (101.18 sq ft) area, with full-span flaperons. Top speed of 200 km/h (124 mph)
Savannah VG
Introduced 2004. This is essentially the "Classic" but with leading edge slats replaced by vortex generators and a slightly different wing profile introduced to gain a faster cruise with very little sacrifice to the stall speed which now 50 km/h (31 mph). Engine choices: 74 kW (99 hp) Rotax 912 ULS flat four; 60 kW (80 hp) Jabiru 2200 flat four; or the 60 kW (80 hp) Suzuki G10 three cylinder inline.

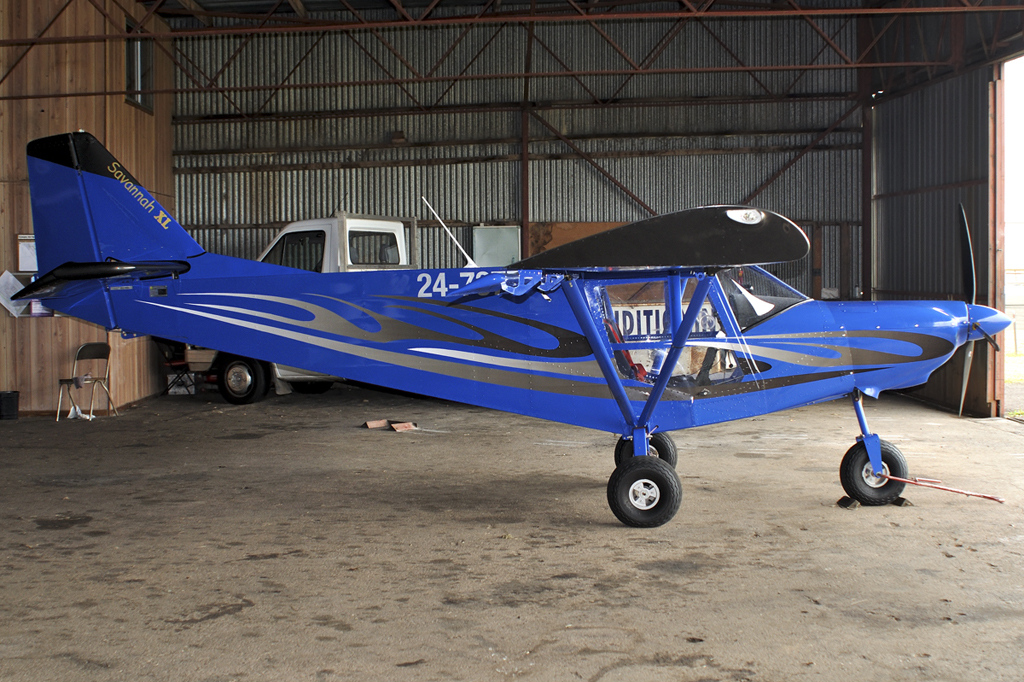
Savannah XL

Savannah XL
Introduced in 2009. As Savannah VG but with cabin width increased to 1,130 mm by bulged, transparent doors; a transparent cabin roof was also introduced for flight safety; this model received a windscreen with a more aerodynamic slope and revised cowling lines. The XL was the first to be installed with rudder pedals that can be adjusted up to 100 mm. The XL model is known in North America as the Savannah VGW.
Savannah S
New model introduced in 2010, with rounded tail fuselage corners. The S is derived from XL (and therefore retains the 1,130 mm cabin width, fully transparent doors; the safer, transparent cabin roof, adjustable rudder pedals, the more aerodynamic, raked windscreen and the XL's integrated cowling lines). This model also does not have the 'corrugated' fuselage sides found on all the previous Savannah models. The Savannah S is the flagship model of the range. Engines used in the Savannah S model include the Austrian manufactured Rotax 912, the Honda-based Viking 130 and the Suzuki-based Aeromomentum AM13 and AM15 engines.

Savannah T

Taildragger model, introduced in 2013.

== Specifications (XL - Jabiru engine) ==
Data from Jane's All the World's Aircraft 2010/11

General characteristics

- Crew: 2
- Length: 6.60 m (21 ft 8 in)
- Wingspan: 9.00 m (29 ft 6 in)
- Height: 2.58 m (8 ft 6 in) with optional rudder extension 2.88 m (9 ft 5 in)
- Wing area: 12.87 m^{2} (138.5 sq ft) gross
- Airfoil: NACA 65-018 (modified)
- Empty weight: 286 kg (631 lb)
- Max takeoff weight: 450 kg (992 lb) European ultralight; experimental 560 kg (1,234 lb); Australian and New Zealand version 600 kg (1,323 lb).
- Fuel capacity: 78 litres (20.6 US gal; 17.2 Imp gal). Australia and New Zealand version with standard long range tanks: capacity = 150 litres (39.6 US gal; 33.0 Imp gal).
- Powerplant: 1 × Jabiru 2200 air cooled flat four, 60 kW (80 hp)
- Powerplant: 1 × Rotax 912 ULS air partly water cooled, four cylinder, 73 kW (98 hp)

Performance

- Maximum speed: 198 km/h (123 mph, 107 kn)
- Cruise speed: 179 km/h (111 mph, 97 kn) at 75% power
- Stall speed: 48 km/h (30 mph, 26 kn) full flaps
- Never exceed speed: 230 km/h (140 mph, 124 kn)
- Endurance: 4 h with standard tanks 8 h with long range tanks
- g limits: +6/-3
- Rate of climb: 6.1 m/s (1,200 ft/min) at 49 knots, fitted with a Rotax 912 ULS engine.
