= HB-Flugtechnik Dandy =

Austrian ultralight aircraft

Dandy

General information
- Type: Ultralight aircraft
- National origin: Austria
- Manufacturer: HB-Flugtechnik
- Designer: Heino Brditschka
- Status: In production (2015)

The HB-Flugtechnik Dandy is an Austrian ultralight aircraft that was designed by Heino Brditschka and produced by HB-Flugtechnik. The aircraft is supplied as a kit for amateur construction or as a complete ready-to-fly-aircraft.

== Design and development ==
The Dandy was designed to comply with the Fédération Aéronautique Internationale microlight rules. It features a strut-braced high-wing, a two-seats-in-side-by-side configuration enclosed cockpit, fixed conventional landing gear and a single engine in tractor configuration.

The aircraft fuselage is made from welded steel tubing, with the wings constructed from aluminum tubing and all surfaces covered in doped aircraft fabric. Its 9.6 m (31.5 ft) span wing has an area of 12.6 m^{2} (136 sq ft). The standard engine available is the 80 hp (60 kW) Rotax 912UL four-stroke powerplant.

== Variants ==
Dandy
Model with side-by-side seating. In production, 2015.
Cubby
Model with tandem seating, resembling a Piper J-3 Cub. In production, 2015.

== Specifications (Dandy) ==
Data from Bayerl

General characteristics

- Crew: one
- Capacity: one passenger
- Wingspan: 9.6 m (31 ft 6 in)
- Wing area: 12.6 m^{2} (136 sq ft)
- Empty weight: 260 kg (573 lb)
- Gross weight: 450 kg (992 lb)
- Fuel capacity: 60 litres (13 imp gal; 16 US gal)
- Powerplant: 1 × Rotax 912UL four cylinder, liquid and air-cooled, four stroke aircraft engine, 60 kW (80 hp)

Performance

- Maximum speed: 170 km/h (110 mph, 92 kn)
- Cruise speed: 150 km/h (93 mph, 81 kn)
- Stall speed: 50 km/h (31 mph, 27 kn)
- Wing loading: 35.7 kg/m^{2} (7.3 lb/sq ft)
