= Brake tester =

There are at least three different types of brake tester used to calculate the braking efforts and efficiencies of a motor vehicle:

- Roller brake testers, consisting of a chassis with a driven roller system
- Plate brake testers, consisting of two parallel measuring plates
- Decelerometers, usually handheld

== Roller brake testers ==
A roller brake tester is a method of allowing the dynamic assessment of the braking system of a motor vehicle, whilst the vehicle itself is in a static condition. This type of brake tester is normally used in UK garages when used as part of an inspection lane for the MOT test.

Roller brake testers consist of a mechanical floor unit which contains electrical motors, two independent sets of three measuring rollers, brake force transducers and additional safety sensors.
The driving rollers operate at a low (known) speed using a gearbox and motor arrangement and during a test measurements of the maximum braking force are taken by applying the vehicle brakes which induces a reaction force on the electric motor itself. An electric transducer with strain gauges then measures the individual induced forces which are acting during the deceleration phase in order to calculate the individual braking forces for each wheel.

In order to minimize any inaccuracy and variation in the measurement, the roller diameter is sufficiently large to reduce the effects of the mechanical relaxation, or flexing, of the tire itself. A special coating on the rollers is designed to be very wear resistant and provide good friction values, both in wet and dry conditions.

A third smaller roller, on each side between the driving rollers, has two functions: The first is to detect if a vehicle is present in the roller bed (a built in safety device to prevent the motor from starting up unless a vehicle is in the brake tester), the second function is to detect when and if tyre slippage occurs in order to make the measurement before a maximum, predefined value of time passes.

During the test, the computer measures the brake force values and the system will calculate the imbalance between the left and right brake forces of an axle, as well as the brake efficiency of the service brake and the parking brake provided that a vehicle weight is either inputted manually or by using an integrated weighing system.

== Plate brake testers ==
A plate brake tester is a method of measuring a vehicles braking system in a dynamic test. The unit consists of two moving parallel plates mounted on force transducers. A measurement of the braking force is made when a vehicle passes over the plates and then applies its brakes. The braking action causes the individual plates to ‘slip’ forwards allowing a calculation of braking force to be made. Brake imbalance between the left and right hand side can also be measured by the differences in voltage measured on each of the force transducers under the chassis. Due to the nature of it dynamic operation, plate brake testers are far less common than roller brake testers in UK garages although they are also an extremely accurate method of measurement.

The extremely accurate plate brake method of measuring a vehicle's braking performance in countries such as Australia and New Zealand is increasingly becoming a far more popular alternative to basic decelerometers due to not only accuracy, measurement speed, and the ease of use, but predominately the greatly improved safety offered by removing the need for vehicle inspectors to brake test vehicles on public roads amongst other road users .

== Decelerometers ==
A decelerometer is a hand held device for measuring dynamic braking forces during a vehicle road test. A vehicle decelerometer operates as if it were, and it could also be known as, an accelerometer as it calculates braking efficiency by using those forces captured during a vehicle's deceleration. A decelerometer is a basic method by which braking effort can be accessed quickly and easily but it is generally used as an indicator to acceptable brake performance. Low efficiency readings should lead to further investigation on either a plate brake tester or a roller brake tester.

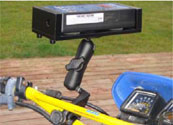
A decelerometer mounted to handlebars
