= Raab Krähe =

German single-seat motor glider, 1958

Krähe
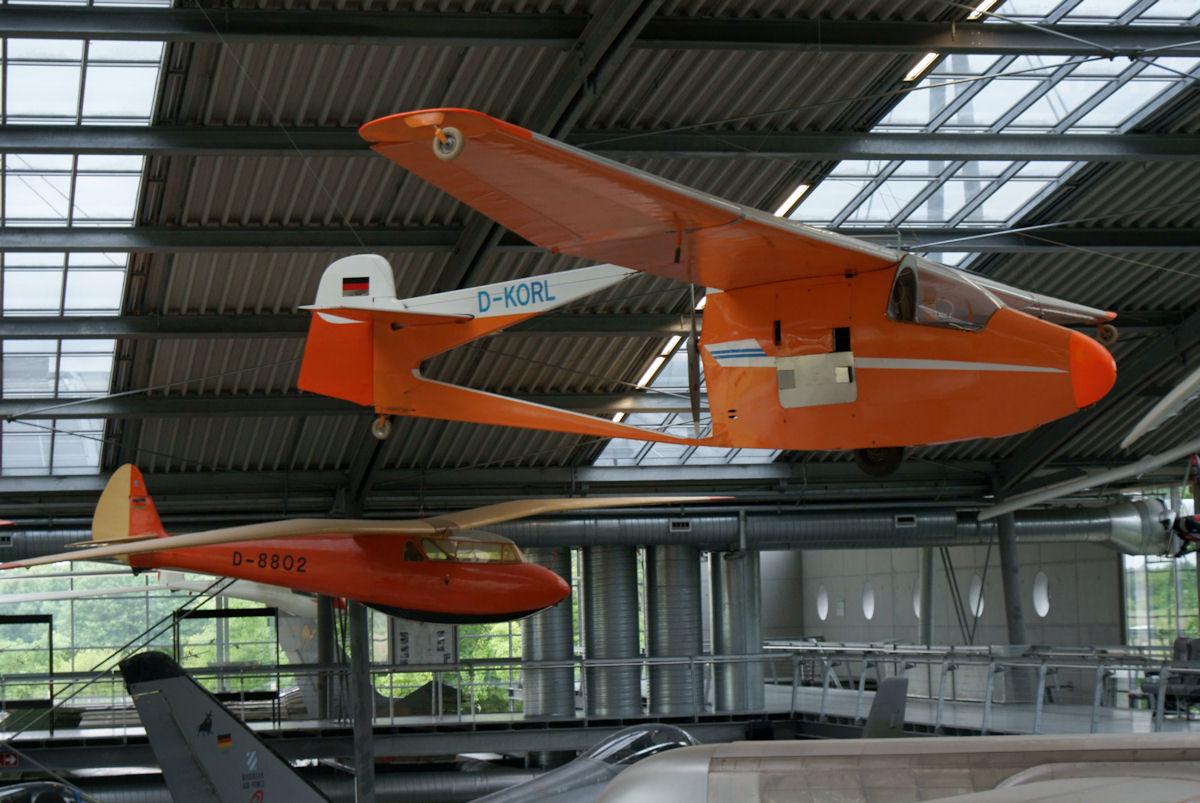
- Raab Krähe IV Powered Glider D-KORL at the Deutsches Museum Flugwerft Oberschleißheim

General information
- Type: Motor glider
- National origin: West Germany
- Designer: Fritz Raab
- Status: No longer in production
- Number built: 30

History
- Introduction date: circa 1958

The Raab Krähe (English: crow) is a West German high-wing, single-seat, pusher configuration motor glider that was designed by Fritz Raab for amateur construction around 1958.

== Design and development ==
Raab designed the Krähe specifically for homebuilders.

The Krähe is constructed from wood, with the fuselage made from a wooden structure covered in doped aircraft fabric. The 12.0 m (39.4 ft) span wings are built with a wooden structure and covered in plywood and fabric. The wings feature spoilers and a custom Raab-designed airfoil. The tailplane is braced with four cables to the wing trailing edge. The landing gear is a fixed monowheel.

The motor installation is unconventional for a motorglider in that the engine is mounted in the rear of the cabin area, with the propeller in between the top and bottom tail boom tubes. Motors used are usually of an output of about 30 hp (22 kW).

About 30 examples were reported completed by 1974.

== Operational history ==
One Krähe built in Austria by Tasso Proppe and imported to the United States was powered by a 27 hp (20 kW) Steyr twin-cylinder, four-stroke engine that produced a cruise speed of 75 mph (121 km/h) on a fuel burn of 1.2 U.S. gallons (4.5 L; 1.00 imp gal) per hour. The aircraft is no longer on the US Federal Aviation Administration registry.

== Variants ==
Krähe
Initial model with monowheel landing gear and propeller in between top and bottom tail boom tubes.
Austria Krähe
Later model with tricycle landing gear and propeller rotating around the upper tail boom tube.

== Specifications (Krähe) ==
Data from Soaring

General characteristics

- Crew: one
- Wingspan: 12 m (39 ft 4 in)
- Wing area: 14.3 m^{2} (154 sq ft)
- Aspect ratio: 10:1
- Airfoil: Raab
- Empty weight: 238 kg (525 lb)
- Gross weight: 333 kg (735 lb)
- Fuel capacity: 8 U.S. gallons (30 L; 6.7 imp gal)
- Powerplant: 1 × Steyr , 20 kW (27 hp)
- Propellers: 2-bladed wooden fixed pitch

Performance

- Cruise speed: 121 km/h (75 mph, 65 kn)
- Endurance: 10 hours loiter
- Maximum glide ratio: 18-20:1 at 77 km/h (48 mph)
- Rate of sink: 1.2 m/s (240 ft/min) at 68 km/h (42 mph)
- Wing loading: 23.3 kg/m^{2} (4.77 lb/sq ft)

== See also ==
- List of gliders

Related development

- Brditschka HB-3
