= ICP Amigo =

Italian homebuilt aircraft

Amigo

General information
- Type: Homebuilt aircraft
- National origin: Italy
- Manufacturer: ICP srl
- Status: Production completed

The ICP Amigo (English: Friend) is an Italian homebuilt aircraft that was designed and produced by ICP srl of Piovà Massaia. When it was available the aircraft was supplied as a kit for amateur construction.

Production was ended and, as of January 2013, the Amigo is no longer listed by ICP as one of their current products.

== Design and development ==
The aircraft features a cantilever low-wing, a two-seats-in-side-by-side configuration enclosed cockpit, fixed tricycle landing gear with wheel pants and a single engine in tractor configuration.

The aircraft is made from aluminum sheet. Its 26.40 ft (8.0 m) span wing has a wing area of 138.00 sq ft (12.821 m^{2}). The acceptable power range is 79 to 118 hp (59 to 88 kW) and the standard engine used is the 80 hp (60 kW) Rotax 912 four stroke powerplant.

The aircraft has a typical empty weight of 274 kg (604 lb) and a gross weight of 441 kg (972 lb), giving a useful load of 167 kg (368 lb). With full fuel of 120 litres (26 imp gal; 32 US gal) the payload for pilot, passenger and baggage is 79 kg (174 lb).

== Specifications (Amigo) ==
Data from AeroCrafter

General characteristics

- Crew: one
- Capacity: one passenger
- Length: 6.04 m (19.80 ft)
- Wingspan: 8.05 m (26.40 ft)
- Wing area: 12.821 m^{2} (138.00 sq ft)
- Empty weight: 274 kg (605 lb)
- Gross weight: 441 kg (972 lb)
- Fuel capacity: 120 litres (26 imp gal; 32 US gal)
- Powerplant: 1 × Lycoming O-235 four cylinder, air-cooled, four stroke aircraft engine, 81 kW (108 hp)
- Propellers: 2-bladed composite

Performance

- Maximum speed: 204 km/h (127 mph, 110 kn)
- Cruise speed: 180 km/h (110 mph, 96 kn)
- Stall speed: 64 km/h (40 mph, 35 kn)
- Range: 740 km (460 mi, 400 nmi)
- Service ceiling: 4,000 m (13,000 ft)
- Rate of climb: 5.1 m/s (1,000 ft/min)
- Wing loading: 34.4 kg/m^{2} (7.04 lb/sq ft)

== See also ==
- HB-Flugtechnik Amigo, a different aircraft with the same model name
