= HB Flugtechnik HB-207 Alfa =

HB-207 Alfa
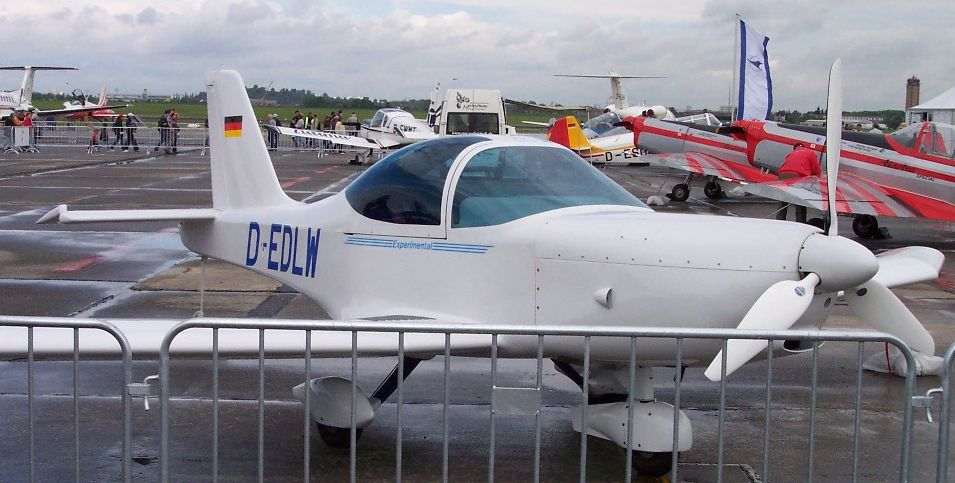
- HB-207 at ILA 2006

General information
- Type: Light training and touring monoplane
- National origin: Austria
- Manufacturer: HB Flugtechnik GmbH
- Number built: 70+

History
- First flight: 14 March 1995

The HB Flugtechnik HB-207 Alfa is an Austrian two-seat light training and touring monoplane designed and built by HB Flugtechnik and was made available as a kit for homebuilding.

== Design and development ==
The Alfa is a low-wing monoplane made from aluminium, with some composite parts, powered by a 110 hp (82 kW) VW-Porsche HB-2400 G/2 flat-four engine driving a five-bladed variable-pitch propeller. It was designed to take a number of different engines and to use two, three or five-bladed propellers. The five-bladed propeller turns at just 1500 rpm and is noted for its quietness in flight, producing only 57 dBA. The 100 hp (75 kW) Rotax 912ULS and the turbocharged 115 hp (86 kW) Rotax 914 powerplants can also be used. The Alfa has room for two in side-by-side seats in an enclosed cockpit with a sliding canopy for entry.

The first aircraft to fly was a retractable tricycle landing gear variant, the HB-207RG. on 14 March 1995. At least 70 had been built by 2005.

== Variants ==
HB 207
Fixed landing gear variant
HB 207RG
Retractable landing gear variant

== Specifications (Utility category) ==
Data from

General characteristics

- Crew: 2
- Length: 5.95 m (19 ft 6.25 in)
- Wingspan: 9.00 m (29 ft 6.25 in)
- Height: 1.95 m (6 ft 4.75 in)
- Wing area: 9.50 m^{2} (102.3 sq ft)
- Aspect ratio: 8.5
- Empty weight: 450 kg (992 lb)
- Gross weight: 640 kg (1,411 lb)
- Powerplant: 1 × VW-Porsche HB-2400 G/2 flat-four piston , 82 kW (110 hp)

Performance

- Maximum speed: 309 km/h (192 mph, 167 kn)
- Cruise speed: 245 km/h (152 mph, 132 kn)
- Stall speed: 93 km/h (58 mph, 50 kn)
- Range: 1,200 km (754 mi, 655 nmi)
- g limits: +4.4/-2.2
- Rate of climb: 5.50 m/s (1,082 ft/min)
