= Brditschka HB-3 =

Austrian aircraft

HB-3, HB-21, and HB-23
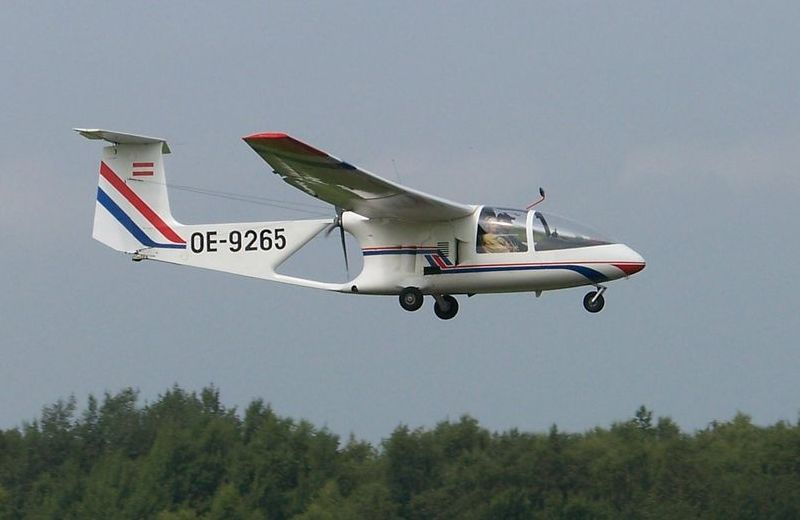
- Brditschka HB-23

General information
- Type: Motorglider
- Manufacturer: HB-Flugtechnik
- Designer: Heino Brditschka

History
- First flight: 23 June 1971

The Brditschka HB-3, HB-21 and HB-23 are a family of motor gliders of unorthodox configuration developed in Austria in the early 1970s.

== Design and development ==
The unusual design was based on work done by Fritz Raab in Germany in the 1960s. The pilot and passengers sit in a fuselage pod with the engine and propeller behind them. The pod also carries the fixed tricycle undercarriage and the high cantilever wing. The tail is carried on a pair of booms that emerge from the top and bottom of the fuselage pod, the upper of which passes through the propeller hub. The HB-21 has a conventional tail and has two seats in tandem accessed by a sidewards-hinged canopy, while the HB-23 has a T-tail and side-by-side seating accessed via gull-wing doors in the canopy.

The Militky MB-E1 was a modified HB-3 with an 8-10 kW (11-13 hp) Bosch KM77 electric motor. It was the first full-sized, crewed aircraft to be solely electrically powered. Flights of 12 minutes duration at up to an altitude of 380 m (1,247 ft) were just within the Ni-Cd battery's capacity. Its first flight was on 23 October 1973.

== Variants ==
Brditschka HB-3
Single seat powered sailplane, powered by 31 kW (42 hp) Rotax 642 engine, 12.00 m (39 ft 4 in) wingspan.
HB-Flugtechnik HB 21
Tandem two-seat derivative of HB-3 with longer span (16.24 m (53 ft 3 in)) wings.
HB-Flugtechnik HB 21/2400
HB-Flugtechnik HB 21/2400 B
HB-Flugtechnik HB 21/2400 V1
HB-Flugtechnik HB 21/2400 V2
HB-Flugtechnik HB 23/2400
HB-Flugtechnik HB 23/2400 SP
HB-Flugtechnik HB 23/2400 Scanliner
Observation version of HB-23 with bubble canopy and provision to carry FLIR or LLTV pods under the wings.
HB-Flugtechnik HB 23/2400 V2

Militky MB-E1
electrically powered version.

== Specifications (HB-23/2400 Hobbyliner) ==
Data from Jane's All The World's Aircraft 1990

General characteristics

- Crew: 1
- Capacity: 1 passenger
- Length: 8.00 m (26 ft 3 in)
- Wingspan: 16.40 m (53 ft 10 in)
- Height: 2.45 m (8 ft 0 in)
- Wing area: 19.07 m^{2} (205.3 sq ft)
- Aspect ratio: 14.1:1
- Airfoil: Wortmann FX-61-184 at root, FX-60-126 at tip
- Empty weight: 560 kg (1,235 lb)
- Max takeoff weight: 760 kg (1,676 lb)
- Fuel capacity: 76 L (17 imp gal; 20 US gal)
- Powerplant: 1 × Volkswagen air-cooled 4-cylinder engine, 73 kW (98 hp)

Performance

- Cruise speed: 180 km/h (110 mph, 97 kn) (max cruise)
- Stall speed: 80 km/h (50 mph, 43 kn) (powered)
- Never exceed speed: 200 km/h (120 mph, 110 kn)
- Range: 800 km (500 mi, 430 nmi)
- Endurance: 6 hours
- Service ceiling: 5,000 m (16,000 ft)
- Maximum glide ratio: 22:1
- Rate of climb: 3.80 m/s (748 ft/min)
- Rate of sink: 1.20 m/s (236 ft/min)
- Takeoff run to 15 m (50 ft): 160 m (525 ft)

== See also ==
Related development

- Raab Krähe

Aircraft of comparable role, configuration, and era

- Edgley Optica
- RFB Fantrainer
