= HB-Flugtechnik =

Austrian aircraft manufacturer

HB-Flugtechnik GmbH
- Company type: Privately held company
- Industry: Aerospace
- Founded: 1970s
- Founder: Heino Brditschka
- Headquarters: Ansfelden, Austria
- Products: Light aircraft, microlights
- Website: www.hb-flugtechnik.at

HB-Flugtechnik GmbH (originally HB-Aircraft Industries Luftfahrtzeug) is an Austrian aircraft manufacturer established in the early 1970s by Heino Brditschka to produce light aircraft of his own design, originally the HB-21 motorglider.

The company started in flight training and light aircraft maintenance and then building light aircraft. From there it progressed to building microlights, with the introduction of the HB-Flugtechnik HB-208 Amigo.

== Products ==
- HB-Flugtechnik HB-202
- HB-Flugtechnik HB-207 Alfa
- HB-Flugtechnik HB-208 Amigo
- HB-Flugtechnik HB-400
- HB-Flugtechnik Cubby
- HB-Flugtechnik Dandy
- HB-Flugtechnik Tornado
- HB-Flugtechnik HB 21
- HB-Flugtechnik HB 23/2400
