= HB-Flugtechnik Amigo =

Austrian ultralight aircraft

Amigo

General information
- Type: Ultralight aircraft
- National origin: Austria
- Manufacturer: HB-Flugtechnik
- Designer: Heino Brditschka
- Status: In production (2012)

The HB-Flugtechnik HB-208 Amigo (English: Friend) is an Austrian ultralight aircraft that was designed by Heino Brditschka and produced by HB-Flugtechnik of Ansfelden. The aircraft is supplied as a kit for amateur construction or as a complete ready-to-fly-aircraft.

The design was the company's first microlight and led to further work in that field.

== Design and development ==
The aircraft was designed to comply with the Fédération Aéronautique Internationale microlight rules and amateur-built rules. It features a strut-braced high-wing, a two-seats-in-side-by-side configuration enclosed cockpit, fixed tricycle landing gear and a single engine in tractor configuration.

The fuselage is made from welded steel tubing, the wing built from wood with its flying surfaces covered in doped aircraft fabric. Its 9.0 m (29.5 ft) span wing has an area of 12.6 m^{2} (136 sq ft) and uses 45° Dornier wingtips. Standard engines are the 80 hp (60 kW) Rotax 912UL and the 100 hp (75 kW) Rotax 912ULS four-stroke powerplants. The ultralight version has a maximum gross weight of 450 kg (992 lb), whereas the amateur-built version has a maximum gross weight of 520 kg (1,146 lb).

As of February 2024, the type is no longer mentioned on the company website, indicating termination of production.

== Specifications (Amigo UL) ==
Data from Bayerl

General characteristics

- Crew: one
- Capacity: one passenger
- Wingspan: 9.0 m (29 ft 6 in)
- Wing area: 11.8 m^{2} (127 sq ft)
- Empty weight: 300 kg (661 lb)
- Gross weight: 450 kg (992 lb)
- Fuel capacity: 60 litres (13 imp gal; 16 US gal)
- Powerplant: 1 × Rotax 912UL four cylinder, liquid and air-cooled, four stroke aircraft engine, 60 kW (80 hp)

Performance

- Maximum speed: 180 km/h (110 mph, 97 kn)
- Cruise speed: 170 km/h (110 mph, 92 kn)
- Stall speed: 55 km/h (34 mph, 30 kn)
- Rate of climb: 5 m/s (980 ft/min)
- Wing loading: 38.1 kg/m^{2} (7.8 lb/sq ft)

== See also ==
- ICP Amigo, a different aircraft with the same model name
