= Bundy tube =

Bundy tube, sometimes called Bundy pipe, is type of double-walled low-carbon steel tube manufactured by rolling a copper-coated steel strip through 720 degrees and resistance brazing the overlapped seam in a process called Bundywelding. Some key sources are Shelley Automation ltd in the UK and SVS Refcomp Pvt Ltd in India

== History ==
It may be zinc or terne coated for corrosion protection. It is used in automotive hydraulic brake lines in cars manufactured in the US since the 1930s.

The Bundy Tubing Company, started in the US, was bought in the 1980s by what is now the British company TI Fluid system.

== Kunifer pipe ==
A 1969 study by the Society of Automotive Engineers (SAE) recommended the replacement of Bundy tube with 90-10 copper-nickel alloy UNS C70600 (Kunifer pipe) because of corrosion concerns. Kunifer pipe has since been adopted by European automakers Volvo, Rolls-Royce, Lotus Cars, Aston-Martin, Porsche, and Audi. Bundy tube still retains the advantage of higher rigidity, which means less volume expansion under pressure.
