= Proactive maintenance =

Proactive maintenance is the maintenance philosophy that supplants “failure reactive” with “failure proactive” by activities that avoid the underlying conditions that lead to machine faults and degradation. Unlike predictive or preventive maintenance, proactive maintenance commissions corrective actions aimed at failure root causes, not failure symptoms. Its central theme is to extend the life of machinery as opposed to

1. making repairs when often nothing is wrong,
2. accommodating failure as routine or normal, or
3. detecting impending failure conditions followed by remediation.

Proactive maintenance depends on rigorous machine inspection and condition monitoring. In mechanical machinery it seeks to detect and eradicate failure root causes such as wrong lubricant, degraded lubricant, contaminated lubricant, botched repair, misalignment, unbalance and operator error.

== See also ==
- Predictive maintenance
