= ICP Vimana =

Vimana

General information
- Type: Two seat light STOL
- National origin: Italy
- Manufacturer: ICP srl, Castelnuovo don Bosco
- Status: in production
- Number built: at least 20

History
- Introduction date: 2006
- First flight: May–June 2006

The ICP Vimana is a single engine, two seat, high wing, light aircraft with STOL capability. Designed and built in Italy by ICP srl, it was introduced in 2006.

== Design and development ==
The Vimana (Vimana is a Sanskrit word, the meanings of which include flying machine) is a conventionally arranged single engine high wing light aircraft, designed to have STOL performance. It seats two side-by-side. The Vimana is mostly constructed from riveted aluminium sheet.

The Vinama's wing is tapered, mostly on the trailing edge, and carries 2° of dihedral. On each side a single, forward leaning strut links the wing to the lower fuselage, assisted by a short intermediate strut at its wing connection. More than half the trailing edge carries inboard double slotted Fowler flaps with a maximum deflection of 40°; the rest of the trailing edge is fitted with conventional ailerons. The leading edge is fitted with electrically operated slats.

The Vimana is normally powered by a 74 kW (99 hp) Rotax 912 ULS flat four driving a three-bladed propeller, though the Turbo version of this engine is an option. It has a standard tricycle undercarriage with faired wheels, fitted with brakes and mounted on spring cantilever legs to the fuselage at the base of the wing spar. The faired nosewheel is steerable. A lightweight version of the Vimana has smaller wheels, as well as lighter instrumentation and cabin furnishings; overall, 43 kg (95 lb) is cut from the empty weight. Access to the cabin is via fully transparent, upward opening doors. There is a small flight accessible compartment for about 20 kg of luggage behind the seats. The underside of the fuselage tapers upwards to the tail, where all surfaces are straight-tapered. The fin and large rudder are swept, with a small fillet. The tailplane is low mounted and the separate elevators, also large, are horn balanced.

Take-off and landing runs (ground roll) are 45 and 40 m (148 and 131 ft) respectively. The corresponding overall distances to clear 15.25 m (50.0 ft) are 97 and 90 m (318 and 295 ft).

The design is an accepted Federal Aviation Administration special light-sport aircraft, as the Skykits Rampage.

== Operational history ==
The Vimana first appeared in public at the Cielo e Volo show at Ozzano in June 2006. A second machine was produced in 2007 and became the North American demonstrator, flown by Skykits of Alberta, Canada, who market the Vimana as the Rampage.

As of mid-2010, there were 5 Vimanas on European registers in addition to the prototype.

== Specifications (Standard weight) ==
Data from Jane's All the World's Aircraft 2010/11

General characteristics

- Capacity: 2
- Length: 7.00 m (23 ft 0 in)
- Wingspan: 8.00 m (26 ft 3 in)
- Height: 2.90 m (9 ft 6 in)
- Wing area: 9.40 m^{2} (101.2 sq ft) gross
- Airfoil: NACA 23015
- Empty weight: 329 kg (725 lb)
- Max takeoff weight: 560 kg (1,235 lb)
- Fuel capacity: 78 L (20.6 US gal; 17.2 Imp gal)
- Powerplant: 1 × Rotax 912 ULS flat four, 74 kW (99 hp)

Performance

- Maximum speed: 220 km/h (140 mph, 120 kn)
- Cruise speed: 197 km/h (122 mph, 106 kn) at 75% power
- Stall speed: 60 km/h (37 mph, 32 kn) flaps down
- Never exceed speed: 240 km/h (150 mph, 130 kn)
- Range: 785 km (488 mi, 424 nmi) with reserves
- Rate of climb: 5.5 m/s (1,080 ft/min) at sea level
