= WVA number =

WVA numbers (German: Waren-Vertriebs-Artikel-Nummern) are a reference and assignment system for brake linings, clutch facings, brake shoes and other friction materials which will especially be used in road vehicles but also in mechanical engineering. The WVA numbering system has been developed by the "VRI-Verband der Reibbelagindustrie" (Federation of Friction Industry), Cologne / Germany. The VRI is the German Federation of Friction Industry and a member of FEMFM - Federation of European Manufacturers of Friction Materials.

Taking the dimensionally determined parameters of the friction materials into account the system assigns the differently dimensioned linings to the respective areas of application and use and accordingly offers a basis for the cooperation and for the exchange of information between manufacturers, distributors and customers.

== Structure ==
WVA Numbers - Allocation Scheme:

Friction Lining Type	WVA Numbers
Drum Brake Linings - Cars	10000 to 14999
Drum Brake Linings - Commercial Vehicles	15000 to 19999
Disc Brake Pads - Cars	20000 to 25999
Shoe Assemblies	26000 to 27999
Disc Brake Pads - Commercial Vehicles	28000 to 29999
Clutch Facings	30000 to 34999
Friction Plates	35000 to 37999
