= Bleed screw =

Gas venting method for a hydraulic system

A bleed screw is a device used to create a temporary opening in an otherwise closed hydraulic system, which facilitates the removal of air or another substance from the system by way of pressure and density differences.

== Applications ==
=== Domestic heating radiators ===
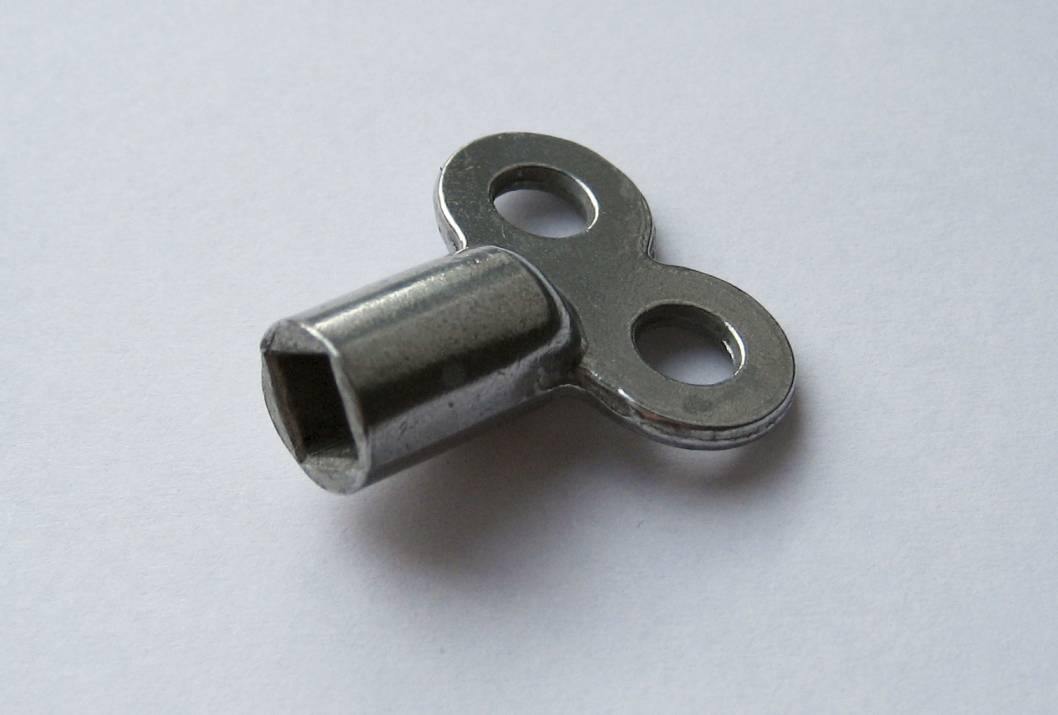
Bleed screw key

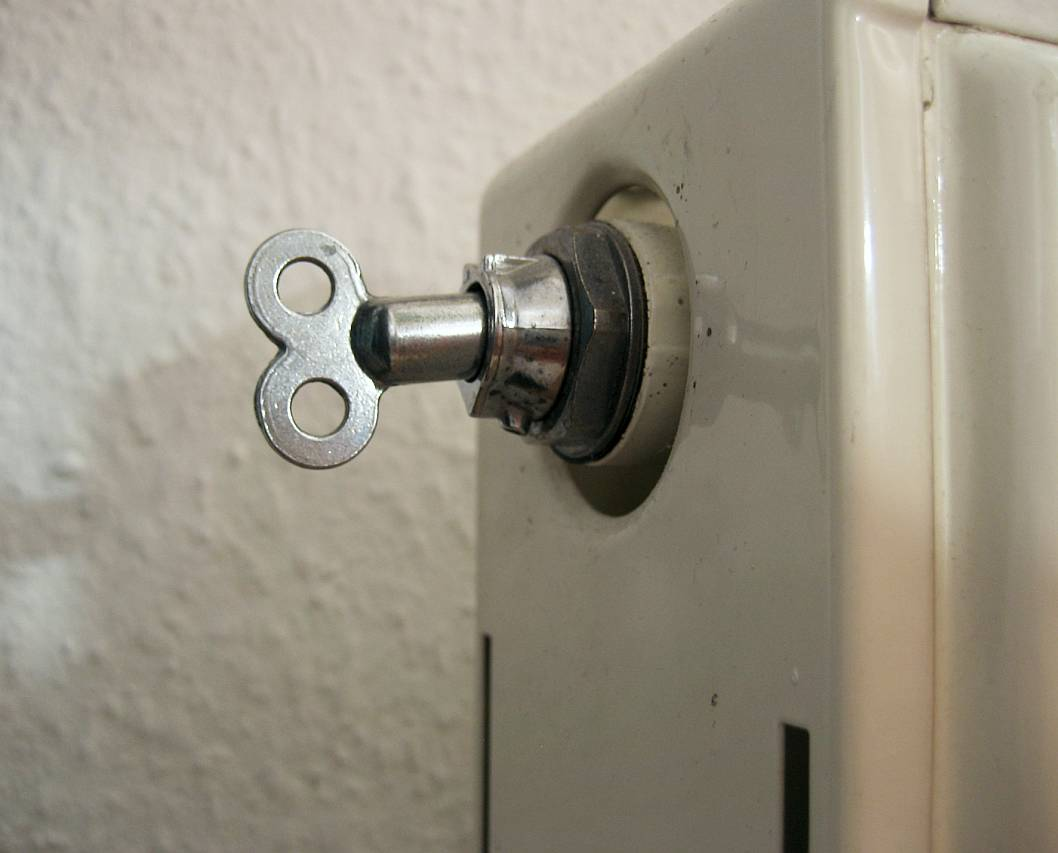
Bleed screw key in use at a domestic radiator

On a home radiator unit, the bleed screw can be opened, usually by means of a key, to allow unwanted air to escape from the unit. Bleed screws are also found on some pump types fulfilling a similar purpose.

They are most often located at the top of the radiator on the side of the inflow pipe. The screw itself, usually a hexagonal or square knob, is inside a small round protrusion.

The key looks similar to that used to wind a clock. It is inserted into the protrusion, mates with the bleed screw and turns it. Opening the bleed screw then allows air which has risen to the top of the radiator system (the top of the radiator itself) to escape and new water to take its place. Any air in the system prevents the working fluid, which carries the heat, from occupying the same space, reducing heating.

A domestic radiator may need bleeding in this way either during a heating upgrade or power flushing, or any time air has been allowed to enter the system.

=== Engine cooling ===
Engine cooling systems can also have bleed screws. They can take the form of a bolt with a hole through the middle that is threaded into a hole on the engine's cylinder head. This hole goes into the water jacket of the cylinder head. In other designs, the bleed screw is placed in the uppermost hose which leads to the heater core, i.e. at the highest point of the cooling system.

When the bleed screw is loosened, antifreeze is added to the engine's cooling system and the increase in fluid pressure displaces air through the opened bleed screw. When liquid begins to flow out, all air has been removed from the system and the bleed screw is closed.

Bleed screws are not common on cars today and are only necessary when design of an engine's cooling system results in areas where air can be trapped in the system. Air in the system can lead to overheating of the engine and in modern cars also to poor vehicle operation (e.g. problems with the AC system or incorrect engine idle).

=== Hydraulic braking systems ===
On a hydraulic vehicle braking systems, the bleed screws (sometimes known as bleed nipples or bleeder valves) are located at the top of each brake caliper to allow bleeding of the braking system. Whenever service work has been performed on the braking system which might have introduced air into the system (i.e. the hydraulic system has been opened), the air must be bled out. This is necessary for correct operation of the system, because air compresses (as opposed to brake fluid which is not compressible). Air in the system reduces the maximum pressure applied to the brake pistons and can lead to loss of braking ability.

=== Hydraulic operated clutches ===
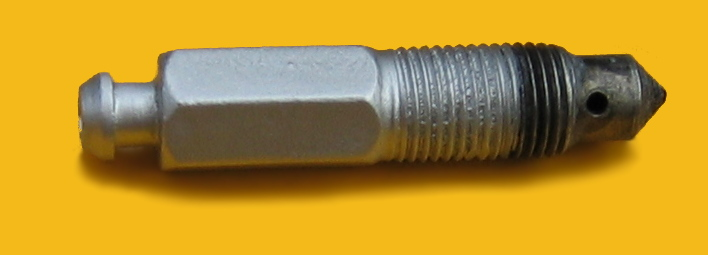
Bleed screw of a clutch slave cylinder

Cars with manual gearshift use a clutch. Clutches are controlled from pedal by bowden cable or hydraulic systems, some use the fluid in common with the brake system. As a dead end of the hydraulic system, the slave cylinder is equipped with a bleed screw.

== See also ==
- Automatic bleeding valve
- Radiator (heating)
- Degasification
