= Brake fluid pressure sensor =

Part on cars and trucks

A brake fluid pressure sensor senses the brake fluid pressure in a hydraulic braking system. The sensor is a type of pressure switch that shows and alerts a fault in the braking system.

== Brake problems ==
The fault could be lack of hydraulic fluid, low brake fluid in the reservoir, a broken hydraulic line or a bad master brake cylinder. The sensor is used to detect pressure differentials in the hydraulic system. If the car alerts a fault in the hydraulic system and the system checks out, the sensor itself may have failed.

== Design ==
The sensor has an input port to measure the hydraulic braking pressure and an electrical connector output for a wire connection for feeding the warning light. Some brake failures do not trip the sensor into a fault mode.

A brake fluid pressure sensor is used in anti-lock braking system (ABS). ABS fault lights come on with unexpected wheel lock from the ABS system, but could also include low fluid in the reservoir.

New accident avoidance technologies system also use brake fluid pressure sensors.

Many large heavy vehicles, like trucks, particularly those having multiple trailers use air brakes that use air pressure sensors.

== Examples ==
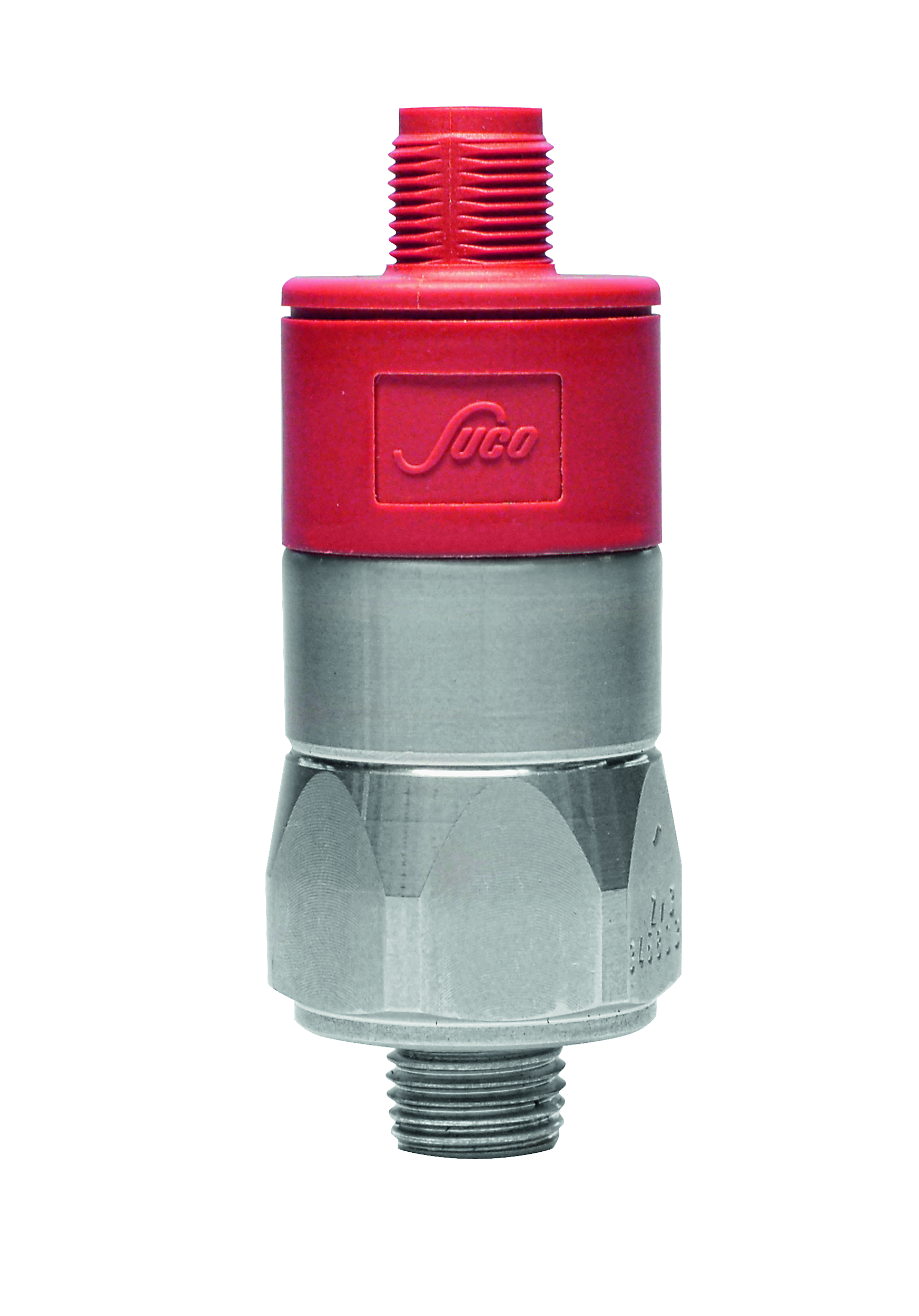
Mechanical Pressure Switch with integrated connector

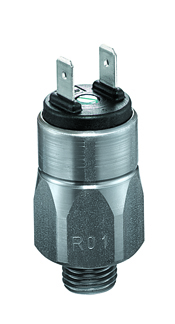
Mechanical Pressure Switch with Plug-in connector

== See also ==
- Hydropneumatic
- List of auto parts
- Pascal's law
