= P-valve =

P-valve may refer to:

- Proportioning valve
- P-valve (diving)
