= Hydraulic brake =

Arrangement of braking mechanism

A schematic illustrating the major components of a hydraulic disc brake system.

A hydraulic brake is an arrangement of braking mechanism which uses brake fluid, typically containing glycol ethers or diethylene glycol, to transfer pressure from the controlling mechanism to the braking mechanism.

== History ==
During 1904, Frederick George Heath, Redditch, England devised and fitted a hydraulic (water/glycerine) brake system to a cycle using a handlebar lever and piston. He obtained patent GB190403651A for “Improvements in hydraulic actuated brakes for cycles and motors”, as well as subsequently for improved flexible rubber hydraulic pipes.

On March 31st 1908, Ernest Walter Weight of Bristol, England devised and fitted a four-wheel hydraulic (oil) braking system to a motor car. He patented it in Great Britain (GB190800241A) in December 1908, later in Europe and the USA and then exhibited it at the 1909 London Motor Show. His brother, William Herbert Weight improved the patent (GB190921122A) and both were assigned to the Weight Patent Automobile Brake Ltd. of 23 Bridge Street, Bristol when it was established in 1909/10. The company, which had a factory at Luckwell Lane, Bristol, installed a four-wheel hydraulic braking system on a Metallurgique chassis, fitted with a Hill and Boll body, which was exhibited at the November 1910 London Motor Show. Although more cars had the brake system installed and the company advertised heavily, it disappeared without achieving the success it deserved.

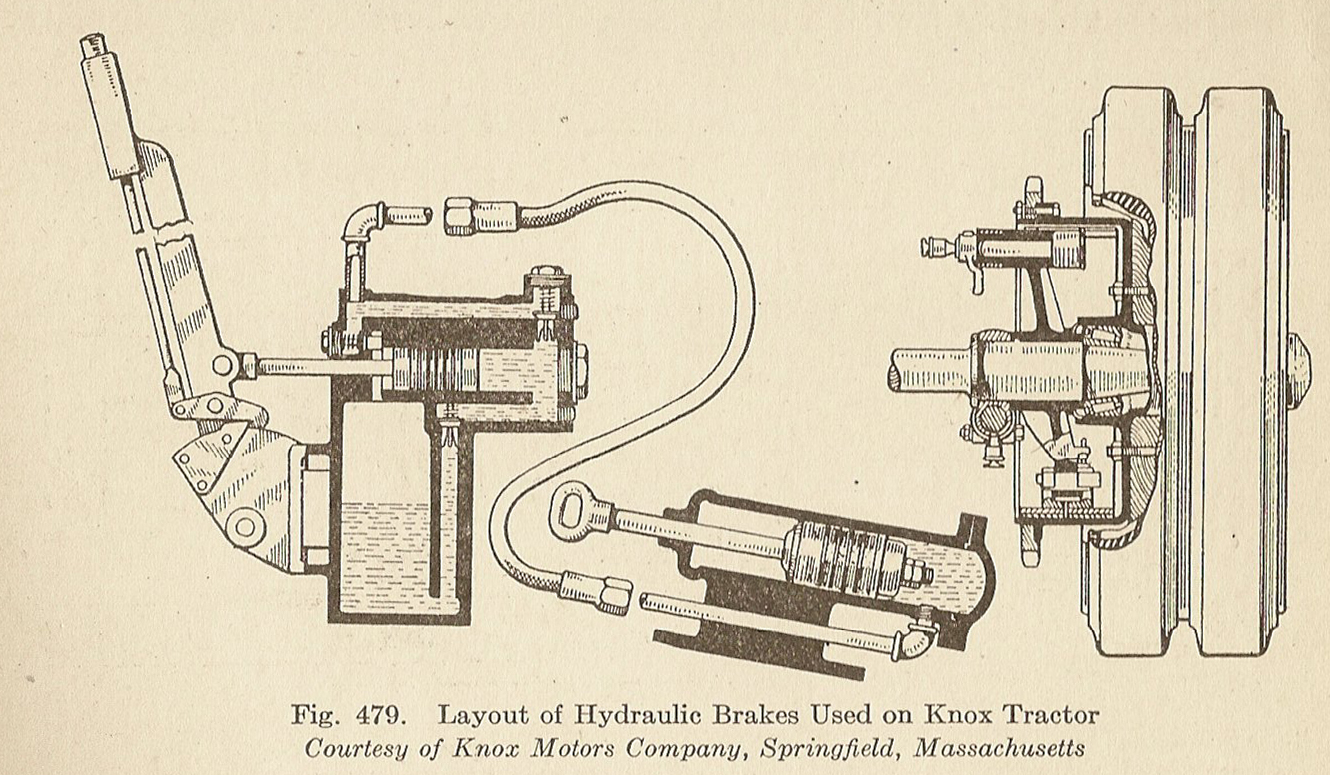
Knox Motors Co. used hydraulic brakes in 1915, in a tractor unit.

Malcolm Loughead (who later changed the spelling of his name to Lockheed) invented hydraulic brakes, which he patented in 1917. "Lockheed" is a common term for brake fluid in France.

Fred Duesenberg used Lockheed Corporation hydraulic brakes on his 1914 racing cars and his car company, Duesenberg, was the first to use the technology on the Duesenberg Model A in 1921.

Knox Motors Company of Springfield, MA was equipping its tractors with hydraulic brakes, beginning in 1915.

The technology was carried forward in automotive use and eventually led to the introduction of the self-energizing hydraulic drum brake system (Edward Bishop Boughton, London England, June 28, 1927) which is still in use today.

== Construction ==
The most common arrangement of hydraulic brakes for passenger vehicles, motorcycles, scooters, and mopeds, consists of the following:

- Brake pedal or lever
- A pushrod (also called an actuating rod)
- A master cylinder assembly containing a piston assembly (made up of either one or two pistons, a return spring, a series of gaskets/ O-rings and a fluid reservoir)
- Reinforced hydraulic lines
- Brake caliper assembly usually consisting of one or two hollow aluminum or chrome-plated steel pistons (called caliper pistons), a set of thermally conductive brake pads and a rotor (also called a brake disc) or drum attached to an axle.

The system is usually filled with a glycol-ether based brake fluid (other fluids may also be used).

At one time, passenger vehicles commonly employed drum brakes on all four wheels. Later, disc brakes were used for the front and drum brakes for the rear. However disc brakes have shown better heat dissipation and greater resistance to 'fading' and are therefore generally safer than drum brakes. So four-wheel disc brakes have become increasingly popular, replacing drums on all but the most basic vehicles. Many two-wheel vehicle designs, however, continue to employ a drum brake for the rear wheel.

The following description uses the terminology for / and configuration of a simple disc brake.

== System operation ==
U.S. Army training film: Hydraulic Brake Operations (circa 1983)

In a hydraulic brake system, when the brake pedal is pressed, a pushrod exerts force on the piston(s) in the master cylinder, causing fluid from the brake fluid reservoir to flow into a pressure chamber through a compensating port. This results in an increase in the pressure of the entire hydraulic system, forcing fluid through the hydraulic lines toward one or more calipers where it acts upon one or more caliper pistons sealed by one or more seated O-rings (which prevent leakage of the fluid).

The brake caliper pistons then apply force to the brake pads, pushing them against the spinning rotor, and the friction between the pads and the rotor causes a braking torque to be generated, slowing the vehicle. Heat generated by this friction is either dissipated through vents and channels in the rotor or is conducted through the pads, which are made of specialized heat-tolerant materials such as kevlar or sintered glass.

Alternatively, in a drum brake, the fluid enters a wheel cylinder and presses one or two brake shoes against the inside of the spinning drum. The brake shoes use a similar heat-tolerant friction material to the pads used in disc brakes.

Subsequent release of the brake pedal/lever allows the spring(s) in the master cylinder assembly to return the master piston(s) back into position. This action first relieves the hydraulic pressure on the caliper, then applies suction to the brake piston in the caliper assembly, moving it back into its housing and allowing the brake pads to release the rotor.

The hydraulic braking system is designed as a closed system: unless there is a leak in the system, none of the brake fluid enters or leaves it, nor does the fluid get consumed through use. Leakage may happen, however, from cracks in the O-rings or from a puncture in the brake line. Cracks can form if two types of brake fluid are mixed or if the brake fluid becomes contaminated with water, alcohol, antifreeze, or any number of other liquids.

== An example of a hydraulic brake system ==
Hydraulic brakes transfer energy to stop an object, normally a rotating axle. In a very simple brake system, with just two cylinders and a disc brake, the cylinders could be connected via tubes, with a piston inside the cylinders. The cylinders and tubes are filled with an incompressible liquid. The two cylinders have the same volume, but different diameters, and thus different cross-section areas. The cylinder that the operator uses is called the master cylinder. The spinning disc brake will be adjacent to the piston with the larger cross-section. Suppose the diameter of the master cylinder is half the diameter of the slave cylinder, so the master cylinder has a cross-section four times smaller. Now, if the piston in the master cylinder is pushed down 40 mm, the slave piston will move 10 mm. If 10 newtons (N) of force are applied to the master piston, the slave piston will press with a force of 40 N.

This force can be further increased by inserting a lever connected between the master piston, a pedal, and a pivot point. If the distance from the pedal to the pivot is three times the distance from the pivot to the connected piston, then it multiplies the pedal force by a factor of 3, when pushing down on the pedal, so that 10 N becomes 30 N on the master piston and 120 N on the brake pad. Conversely, the pedal must move three times as far as the master piston. If the pedal is pushed down 120 mm, the master piston will move 40 mm and the slave piston will move the brake pad by 10 mm.

== Component specifics ==
(For typical light duty automotive braking systems)

In a four-wheel car, the FMVSS Standard 105, 1967; requires that the master cylinder be divided internally into two sections, each of which pressurizes a separate hydraulic circuit. Each section supplies pressure to one circuit. The combination is known as a tandem master cylinder. Passenger vehicles typically have either a front/rear split brake system or a diagonal split brake system (the master cylinder in a motorcycle or scooter may only pressurize a single unit, which will be the front brake).

A front/rear split system uses one master cylinder section to pressurize the front caliper pistons and the other section to pressurize the rear caliper pistons. A split circuit braking system is now required by law in most countries for safety reasons; if one circuit fails, the other circuit can still stop the vehicle.

Diagonal split systems were used initially on American Motors automobiles in the 1967 production year. The right front and left rear are served by one actuating piston while the left front and the right rear are served, exclusively, by a second actuating piston (both pistons pressurize their respective coupled lines from a single foot pedal). If either circuit fails, the other, with at least one front wheel braking (the front brakes provide most of the braking force, due to weight transfer), remains intact to stop the mechanically damaged vehicle. By the 1970s, diagonally split systems had become common among automobiles sold in the United States. This system was developed with front-wheel-drive cars' suspension design to maintain better control and stability during a system failure.

A triangular split system was introduced on the Volvo 140 series from MY 1967, where the front disc brakes have a four-cylinder arrangement, and both circuits act on each front wheel and on one of the rear wheels. The arrangement was kept through subsequent model series 200 and 700.

The diameter and length of the master cylinder has a significant effect on the performance of the brake system. A larger diameter master cylinder delivers more hydraulic fluid to the caliper pistons, yet requires more brake pedal force and less brake pedal stroke to achieve a given deceleration. A smaller diameter master cylinder has the opposite effect.

A master cylinder may also use differing diameters between the two sections to allow for increased fluid volume to one set of caliper pistons or the other and is called a "quick take-up" M/C. These are used with "low drag" front calipers to increase fuel economy.

A proportioning valve may be used to reduce the pressure to the rear brakes under heavy braking. This limits the rear braking to reduce the chances of locking up the rear brakes, and greatly lessens the chances of a spin.

=== Power brakes ===
The vacuum booster or vacuum servo is used in most modern hydraulic brake systems which contain four wheels, the vacuum booster is attached between the master cylinder and the brake pedal and multiplies the braking force applied by the driver. These units consist of a hollow housing with a movable rubber diaphragm across the center, creating two chambers. When attached to the low-pressure portion of the throttle body or intake manifold of the engine, the pressure in both chambers of the unit is lowered. The equilibrium created by the low pressure in both chambers keeps the diaphragm from moving until the brake pedal is depressed. A return spring keeps the diaphragm in the starting position until the brake pedal is applied. When the brake pedal is applied, the movement opens an air valve which lets in atmospheric pressure air to one chamber of the booster. Since the pressure becomes higher in one chamber, the diaphragm moves toward the lower pressure chamber with a force created by the area of the diaphragm and the differential pressure. This force, in addition to the driver's foot force, pushes on the master cylinder piston. A relatively small diameter booster unit is required; for a very conservative 50% manifold vacuum, an assisting force of about 1500 N is produced by a 20 cm diaphragm with an area of 0.03 square meters. The diaphragm will stop moving when the forces on both sides of the chamber reach equilibrium. This can be caused by either the air valve closing (due to the pedal apply stopping) or if "run out" is reached. Run out occurs when the pressure in one chamber reaches atmospheric pressure and no additional force can be generated by the now stagnant differential pressure. After the run out point is reached, only the driver's foot force can be used to further apply the master cylinder piston.

The fluid pressure from the master cylinder travels through a pair of steel brake tubes to a pressure differential valve, sometimes referred to as a "brake failure valve", which performs two functions: it equalizes pressure between the two systems, and it provides a warning if one system loses pressure. The pressure differential valve has two chambers (to which the hydraulic lines attach) with a piston between them. When the pressure in either line is balanced, the piston does not move. If the pressure on one side is lost, the pressure from the other side moves the piston. When the piston makes contact with a simple electrical probe in the center of the unit, a circuit is completed, and the operator is warned of a failure in the brake system.

From the pressure differential valve, brake tubing carries the pressure to the brake units at the wheels. Since the wheels do not maintain a fixed relation to the automobile, it is necessary to use hydraulic brake hose from the end of the steel line at the vehicle frame to the caliper at the wheel. Allowing steel brake tubing to flex invites metal fatigue and, ultimately, brake failure. A common upgrade is to replace the standard rubber hoses with a set which are externally reinforced with braided stainless-steel wires. The braided wires have negligible expansion under pressure and can give a firmer feel to the brake pedal with less pedal travel for a given braking effort.

The term 'power hydraulic brakes' can also refer to systems operating on very different principles where an engine-driven pump maintains continual hydraulic pressure in a central accumulator. The driver's brake pedal simply controls a valve to bleed pressure into the brake units at the wheels, rather than actually creating the pressure in a master cylinder by depressing a piston. This form of brake is analogous to an air brake system but with hydraulic fluid as the working medium rather than air. However, on an air brake air is vented from the system when the brakes are released and the reserve of compressed air must be replenished. On a power hydraulic brake system fluid at low pressure is returned from the brake units at the wheels to the engine-driven pump as the brakes are released, so the central pressure accumulator is almost instantly re-pressurised. This makes the power hydraulic system highly suitable for vehicles that must frequently stop and start (such as buses in cities). The continually circulating fluid also removes problems with freezing parts and collected water vapour that can afflict air systems in cold climates. The AEC Routemaster bus is a well-known application of power hydraulic brakes and the successive generations of Citroen cars with hydropneumatic suspension also used fully powered hydraulic brakes rather than conventional automotive brake systems. Most large aircraft also use power hydraulic wheel brakes, due to the immense amounts of braking force they can provide; the wheel brakes are linked to one or more of the aircraft's main hydraulic systems, with the addition of an accumulator to allow the aircraft to be braked even in the event of a hydraulic failure.

== Special considerations ==
Air brake systems are bulky, and require air compressors and reservoir tanks. Hydraulic systems are smaller and less expensive.

Hydraulic fluid must be non-compressible. Unlike air brakes, where a valve is opened and air flows into the lines and brake chambers until the pressure rises sufficiently, hydraulic systems rely on a single stroke of a piston to force fluid through the system. If any vapor is introduced into the system it will compress, and the pressure may not rise sufficiently to actuate the brakes.

Hydraulic braking systems are sometimes subjected to high temperatures during operation, such as when descending steep grades. For this reason, hydraulic fluid must resist vaporization at high temperatures.

Water vaporizes easily with heat and can corrode the metal parts of the system. Water which enters brake lines, even in small amounts, will react with most common brake fluids (i.e., those which are hygroscopic) causing the formation of deposits which can clog the brake lines and reservoir. It is almost impossible to completely seal any brake system from exposure to water, which means that regular changing out of brake fluid is necessary to ensure that the system is not becoming overfilled with the deposits caused by reactions with water. Light oils are sometimes used as hydraulic fluids specifically because they do not react with water: oil displaces water, protects plastic parts against corrosion, and can tolerate much higher temperatures before vaporizing, but has other drawbacks vs. traditional hydraulic fluids. Silicone fluids are a more expensive option.

"Brake fade" is a condition caused by overheating in which braking effectiveness reduces, and may be lost. It may occur for many reasons. The pads which engage the rotating part may become overheated and "glaze over", becoming so smooth and hard that they cannot grip sufficiently to slow the vehicle. Also, vaporization of the hydraulic fluid under temperature extremes or thermal distortion may cause the linings to change their shape and engage less surface area of the rotating part. Thermal distortion may also cause permanent changes in the shape of the metal components, resulting in a reduction in braking capability that requires replacement of the affected parts.

== See also ==
- Air brake (road vehicle)
- Anti-lock braking system
- Bicycle brake systems
- Brake bleeding
- Brake-by-wire
- Fuse (hydraulic)
- Hydraulics
- Hydraulic circuit
- Railway air brake
- Torque converter
- Vehicle brake
