= Gravity brake =

Gravity brake may refer to:

- Gravity brake bleeding, a method for replacing automotive brake fluid
- A type of check valve typically used in solar water heating systems
- A fictional device designed to stop a falling elevator in the film The Towering Inferno
- Fall arrest, a form of fall protection which involves the safe stopping of a person already falling
