= Dioctyl sebacate =

Names
- IUPAC name Bis(2-ethylhexyl) decanedioate
- Systematic IUPAC name [Heptane-3-yl-(-3-methane-1,1-diyl)-] decanedioate
- Other names Di(2-ethylhexyl) sebacate, Proviplast 1988, dioctyl sebacate (archaic)

Identifiers
CAS Number	122-62-3
3D model (JSmol)	Interactive image
ChemSpider	28959
ECHA InfoCard	100.004.145
PubChem CID	31218
UNII	U9LS47Q72Q
CompTox Dashboard (EPA)	DTXSID7025055
- InChI: InChI=1S/C26H50O4/c1-5-9-17-23(7-3)21-29-25(27)19-15-13-11-12-14-16-20-26(28)30-22-24(8-4)18-10-6-2/h23-24H,5-22H2,1-4H3 Key: VJHINFRRDQUWOJ-UHFFFAOYSA-N; InChI=1/C26H50O4/c1-5-9-17-23(7-3)21-29-25(27)19-15-13-11-12-14-16-20-26(28)30-22-24(8-4)18-10-6-2/h23-24H,5-22H2,1-4H3 Key: VJHINFRRDQUWOJ-UHFFFAOYAA
- SMILES: CCCCC(CC)COC(=O)CCCCCCCCC(=O)OCC(CC)CCCC

Properties
Chemical formula	C_{26}H_{50}O_{4}
Molar mass	426.682 g·mol^{−1}
Density	0.9 of water
Melting point	−48 °C (−54 °F; 225 K)
Boiling point	256 °C (493 °F; 529 K) at 0.7 kPa
Solubility in water	none
Vapor pressure	24 μPa at 37°C

Hazards
- Occupational safety and health (OHS/OSH)
Main hazards	reacts with oxidants
Flash point	210 °C (410 °F; 483 K) open cup
- Lethal dose or concentration (LD, LC)
LD_{50} (median dose)	5 g/kg (rat, orally)
- Except where otherwise noted, data are given for materials in their standard state (at 25 °C [77 °F], 100 kPa). verify (what is ?) Infobox references

Dioctyl sebacate (also di(2-ethylhexyl) sebacate, commonly abbreviated as DOS, DEHS, and BEHS) is an organic compound which is the diester of sebacic acid and 2-ethylhexanol.

It is an oily colorless liquid and is used as a plasticizer, including in the explosive C-4. It has also found use in Dot 5 brake fluid, in ester-based engine oils and additives, as seed particle for particle image velocimetry (PIV) and as a model compound that forms stable aerosols.
