= Master cylinder =

Control device that converts force into hydraulic pressure

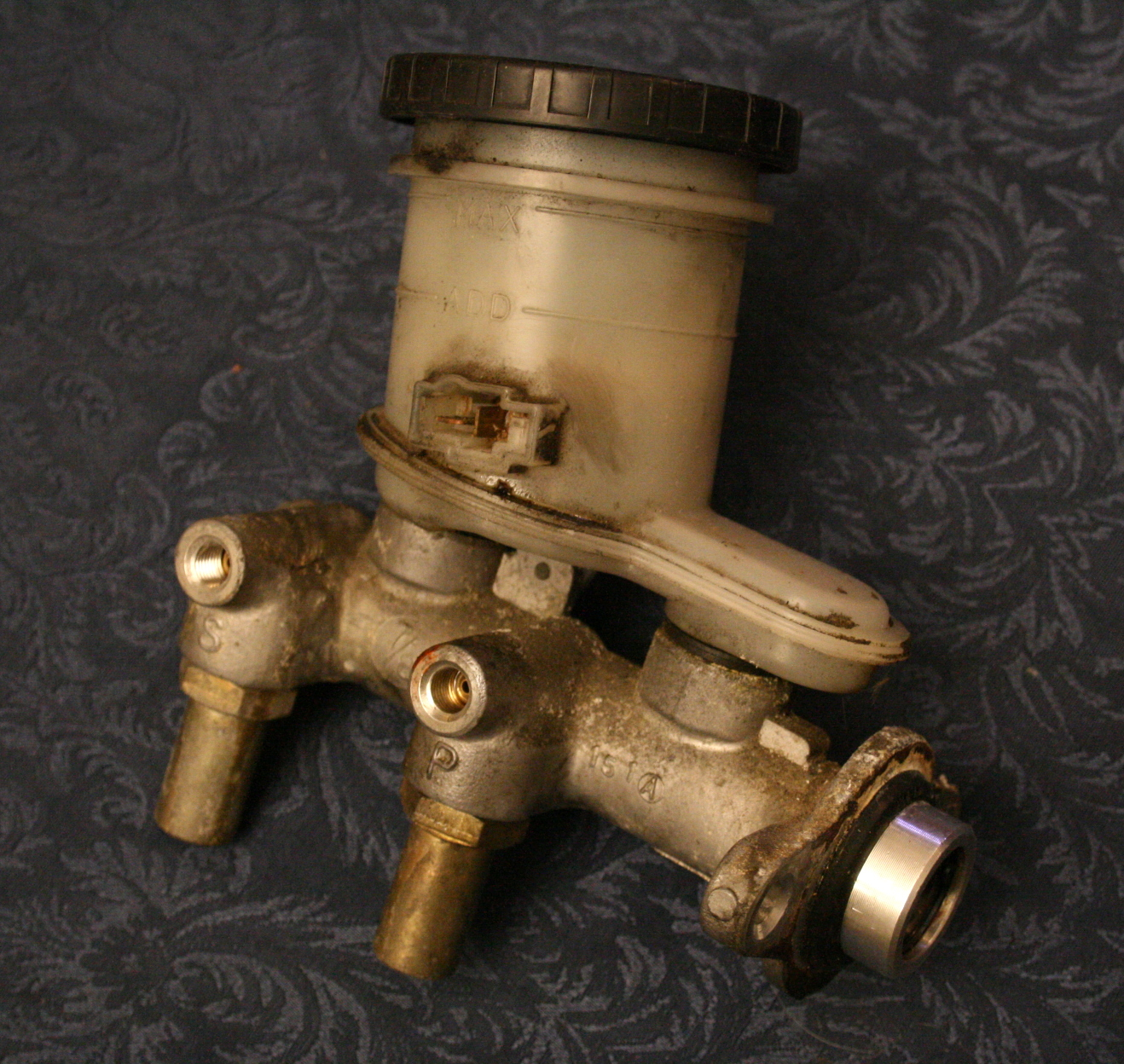
A master cylinder from a Geo Storm

Master cylinder schematic for a dual brake circuit

In automotive engineering, the master cylinder is a control device that converts force (commonly from a driver's foot) into hydraulic pressure. This device controls slave cylinders located at the other end of the hydraulic brake system and/or the hydraulic clutch system.

As piston(s) move along the bore of the master cylinder, this movement is transferred through the hydraulic fluid, to result in a movement of the slave cylinder(s). The hydraulic pressure created by moving a piston (inside the bore of the master cylinder) toward the slave cylinder(s) compresses the fluid evenly, but by varying the comparative surface area of the master cylinder and each slave cylinder, one can vary the amount of force and displacement applied to each slave cylinder, relative to the amount of force and displacement applied to the master cylinder.

== Vehicle applications ==
The most common vehicle uses of master cylinders are in brake and clutch systems.

- In brake systems, the operated devices are cylinders inside brake calipers and/or drum brakes; these cylinders may be called wheel cylinders or slave cylinders, and they push the brake pads towards a surface that rotates with the wheel (this surface is typically either a drum or a disc, a.k.a. a rotor) until the stationary brake pad(s) create friction against that rotating surface (typically the rotating surface is metal or ceramic/carbon, for their ability to withstand heat and friction without wearing-down rapidly).
- In the clutch system, the device which the master cylinder operates is called the slave cylinder; it moves the throw out bearing until the high-friction material on the transmission's clutch disengages from the engine's metal (or ceramic/carbon) flywheel.

For hydraulic brakes or clutches alike, flexible high-pressure hoses or inflexible hard-walled metal tubing may be used; but the flexible variety of tubing is needed for at least a short length adjacent to each wheel, whenever the wheel can move relative to the car's chassis (this is the case on any car with steering and other suspension movements; some drag racers and go-karts have no rear suspension, as the rear axle is welded to the chassis, and some antique cars also have no rear suspension movement).

A reservoir above each master cylinder supplies the master cylinder with enough brake fluid to avoid air from entering the master cylinder (even the typical clutch uses brake fluid, but it may also be referred to as "clutch fluid" in a clutch application).

Each piston in a master cylinder operates a brake circuit, and for modern light trucks and passenger cars, usually, there are two circuits for safety reasons. This is done in a diagonally split hydraulic system i.e. one circuit operates front left and right rear brakes, while the secondary works the other two wheels. If there is a failure in one of the brake lines or the caliper seal, one of the circuits will still be intact and still be able to stop the vehicle. Each circuit works on opposite corners in order to avoid destabilizing the vehicle that would happen if only one axle has brakes while the other axle has none. With only one circuit working there are significantly longer stopping distances and repairs should be done before driving again.

When inspecting brake pads and rotors for wear, drivers and mechanics need to look out for uneven component wear since it could be a sign of low pressure or failure in one of the brake circuits.

== See also ==
- Master-slave (technology)
- Brake fluid pressure sensor
- List of auto parts
- Pascal's law
