= Automatic bleeding valve =

Plumbing valve

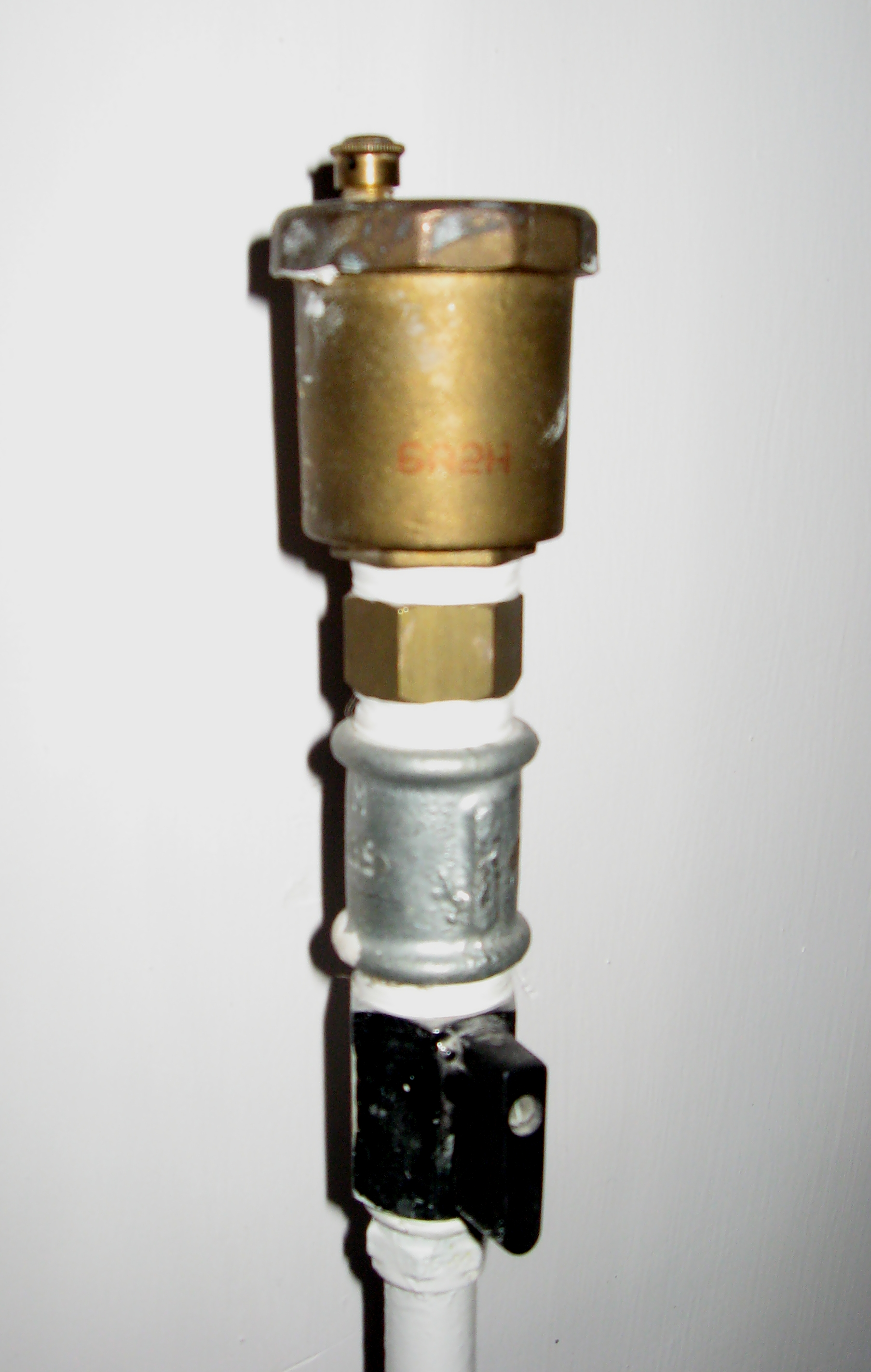
Brass-bodied float valve

An automatic bleeding valve or air release valve (ARV) is a plumbing valve used to automatically release trapped air from a heating system.

Air, or other gas, may collect within plumbing. For water delivery systems to taps and basins, particularly with good main supply pressure, this air is usually flushed through with the water flow and does not cause a problem, although in some hot-water systems (particularly Gravity systems) air locks can be problematic.

In a closed heating system though, it has no other means of escape and builds up. An air bubble trapped within a radiator means that no hot water circulates in the upper part and so the heating power of the radiator is reduced. If air is trapped within the boiler this may cause pump cavitation or boiling and overheating within the heat exchanger.

== Installation and use ==
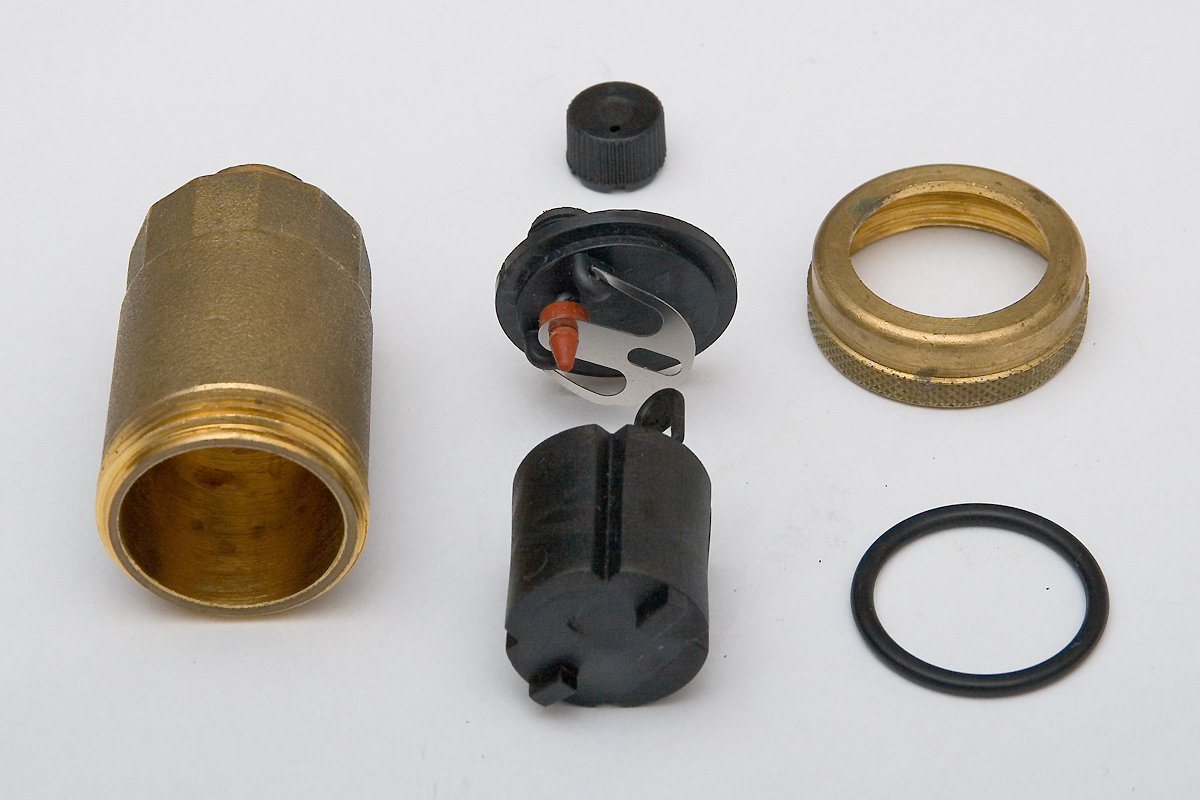
Dismantled valve components

Automatic valves are used to release trapped air as it collects. They are not a substitute for bleeding a system manually when it is first filled during commissioning, nor for remedial bleeding if the system becomes choked with trapped air. In those cases, individual bleed screws on each radiator, or high pipe run, are opened manually.

The valves are installed at a high point of the system, where trapped air collects. They may be installed at the highest point in a system, but in a system with pumped circulation this is rarely necessary. Instead they are placed at some local high point, such as the highest point within a utility cupboard or boiler room, even though this is in a basement. European domestic gas boilers often include such a valve within the boiler casing itself.

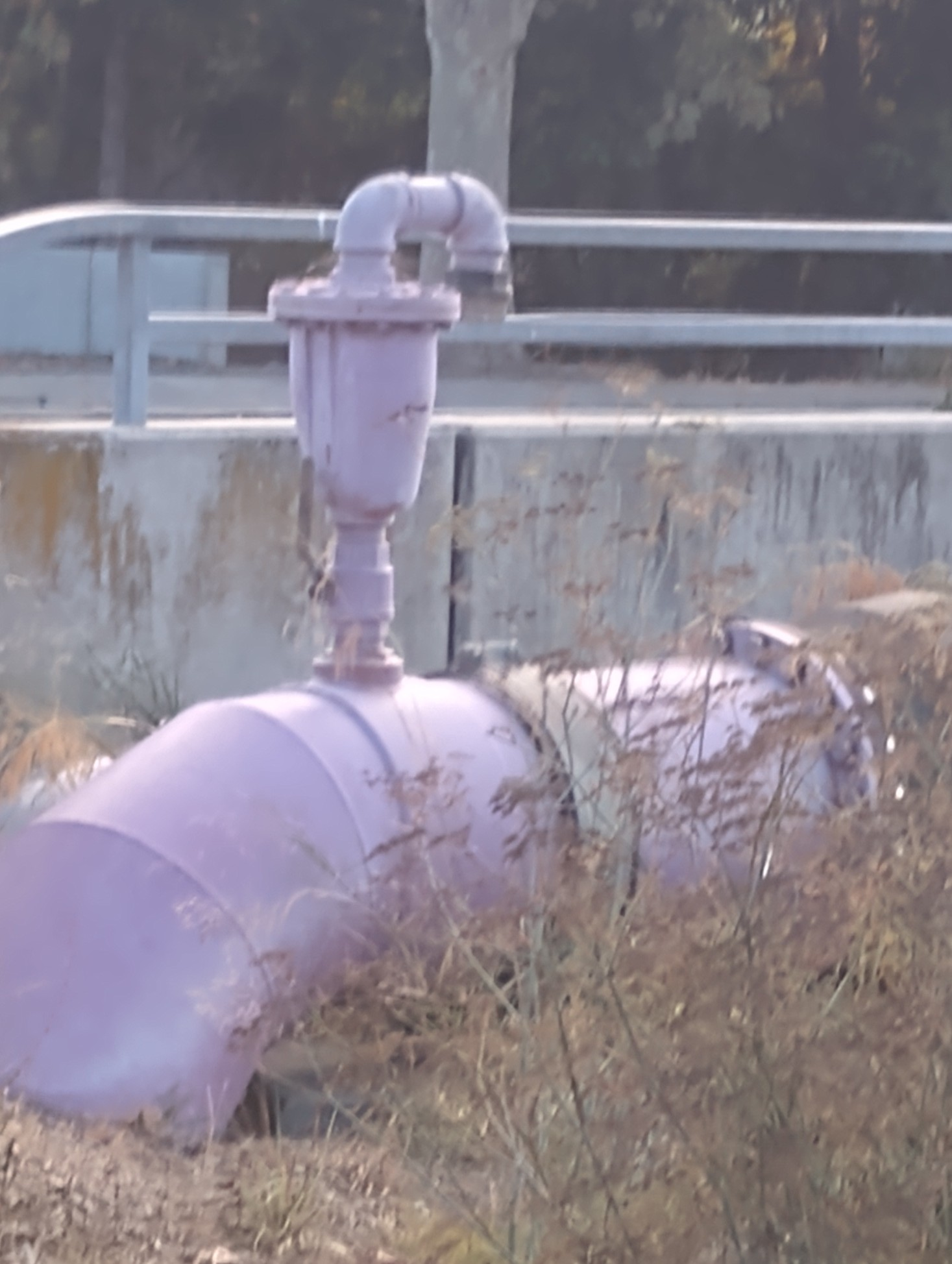
An air release valve on an elevated section of a large diameter lavender-colored pipe

A working system should not generate further trapped gas. Air may be drawn in if there is a small leak, or dissolved air in make-up water may come out of solution, but this generally indicates a system leak if new water is needing to be added. The most likely cause of continual gas bleeding is hydrogen, rather than air. If there is corrosion or rusting of internal metal components, this releases hydrogen gas. The appropriate cure here though is the use of a chemical inhibitor, rather than continual bleeding.

The valves are normally installed with the first installation of a system, then remain in place for the life of the system. They are generally reliable and require no maintenance. If they do eventually fail, they are replaced rather than repaired. A leaking valve commonly shows a dribble of water from the air vent, or stains of rust or limescale.

== Construction and valve operation ==
=== Float valves ===
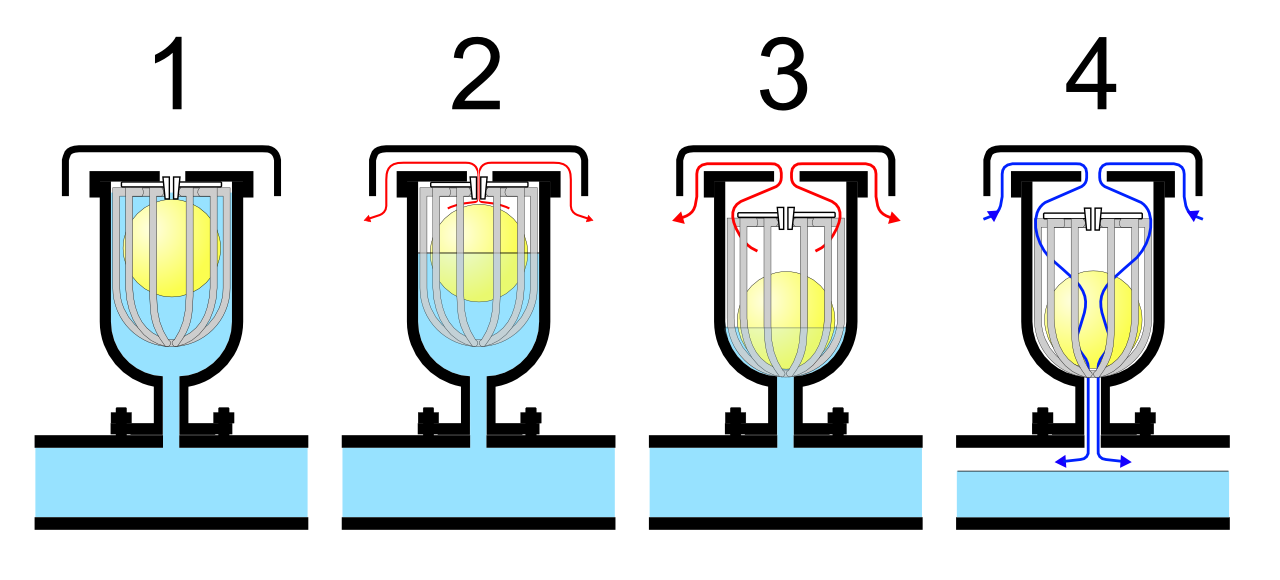
Float valve internal operation

Construction is of the usual cast brass housing for plumbing parts, with a threaded connection to the pipework at the base. The top has a small outlet, usually hidden beneath a plastic dust cap. Internally there is a large hollow body, normally filled with water, and containing a float valve. The valve must always be installed vertically, usually at the top of a short vertical pipe.

If the valve body is filled with water, the float moves upwards and closes the valve. If air collects in the valve body, the waterline lowers, as does the float, and the valve opens to release it. To give more sealing force on the valve, the float generally works the valve through a lever. A greater movement of the float gives a shorter, but more forceful, movement of the valve. This lever mechanism may be simply, almost crudely, made of a pressed steel strip which acts as a bending hinge.

Larger valves are available for larger systems and these may be more sophisticated. They usually have a manual bleed valve or screw. They are also dismantlable for cleaning or repair. The float linkage may have multiple lever arms, in order to give greater mechanical advantage on the valve.

A simpler valve appears similar to the venturi valve, but works by the float principle. These are simple poppet valves, operating by direct float action and sealing against the upper valve seat.

=== Radiator valves ===
Small automatic valves are available to fit individual radiators. As these need to operate in any orientation, they use a different mechanism rather than a float. The hygroscopic vent system uses hygroscopic cellulose fibre discs. These are small discs of material that expand when wet and shrink if warm and dry. A dry valve acts as an air vent until a dribble of water passes through it and swells the cartridge. If the valve dries out again, it re-opens. A characteristic of these valves is that they function best on the hot delivery side of a radiator and may not open as vents unless the water supply is hot.

=== Venturi valves ===
These operate by the varying viscosity of liquids and gases and are designed for situations, such as fire truck hoses, where there is a large flow and a large quantity of air to be vented rapidly. A conical plug valve is spring-loaded. Flow around this valve acts against spring pressure. Flow of liquid is sufficient to hold the valve against the spring, flow of air is not.

== See also ==
- Bleed screw
