= Proportioning valve =

Vehicle component

A cross-section of a proportioning safety valve

A proportioning valve is a valve that relies on the laws of fluid pressure to distribute input forces to one or more output lines.

Proportioning valves are frequently used in cars and other road vehicles to reduce the brake fluid pressure to the rear brakes. Due to weight distribution during heavy braking, more pressure is needed for front brakes. A proportioning valve reduces the pressure in the hydraulic lines to the rear brakes relative to that supplied to the front brakes during this heavy braking.

== See also ==
- Pressure regulator
- Electronic brakeforce distribution
