= Tell-tale (automotive) =

Light that indicates malfunction of a system

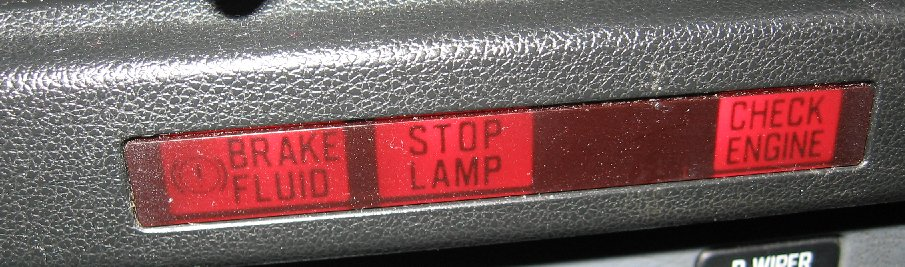
A group of tell-tales showing lights for "brake fluid", "stop lamp" and "check engine"

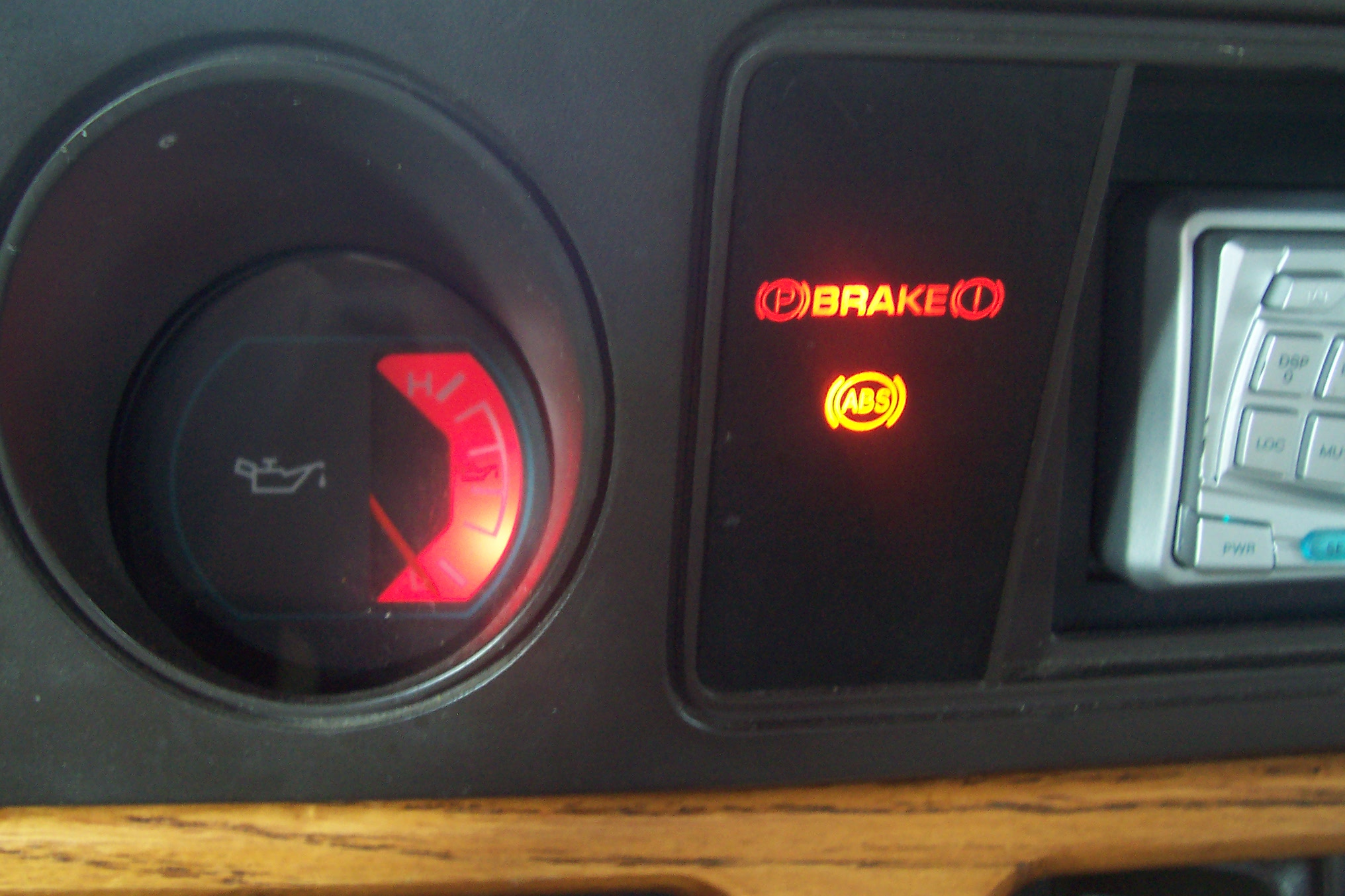
Graphical tell-tales

A tell-tale or warning light, sometimes informally called an idiot light, is an indicator of malfunction or operation of a system, indicated by a binary (on/off) illuminated light, symbol or text legend.

The "idiot light" terminology arises from popular frustration with automakers' use of lights for crucial functions which could previously be monitored by gauges, so a troublesome condition could be detected and corrected early. Such early detection of problems with, for example, engine temperature or oil pressure or charging system operation is not possible via an idiot light, which lights only when a fault has already occurred – thus providing no advance warnings or details of the malfunction's extent. The Hudson automobile company was the first to use lights instead of gauges for oil pressure and the voltmeter, starting in the mid-1930s.

== Regulation ==
Automotive tell-tales are regulated by automobile safety standards worldwide. In the United States, National Highway Traffic Safety Administration Federal Motor Vehicle Safety Standard 101 includes tell-tales in its specifications for vehicle controls and displays. In Canada, the analogous Canada Motor Vehicle Safety Standard 101 applies. In Europe and throughout most of the rest of the world, ECE Regulations specify various types of tell-tales.

== Types ==
Different tell-tales can convey different kinds of information. One type lights or blinks to indicate a failure (as of oil pressure, engine temperature control, charging current, etc.); lighting and blinking indicate progression from warning to failure indication. Another type lights to alert the need for specific service after a certain amount of time or distance has elapsed (e.g., to change the oil).

Colour may also communicate information about the nature of the tell-tale, for example red may signify that the vehicle cannot continue driving (e.g. oil pressure). Many older vehicles used schemes which were specific to the manufacturer, e.g. some British Fords of the 1960s used green for oil pressure warning, while many other makes of the same era used amber for oil pressure.

=== Oil pressure ===
The oil pressure tell-tale illuminates when engine oil pressure drops below a predetermined level. The light normally appears when the vehicle ignition is turned on, but the engine is not running, as it detects no oil pressure due to the oil pump not operating (the oil pump is powered off the crankshaft, so only operates when the engine is running). It normally turns off a few seconds after engine start as the oil pump starts working and building up oil pressure. This tell-tale can bear the legend oil or a pictogram of an oil can. Some cars illuminate the light red or yellow, depending on the action needed to be taken.

=== Engine temperature/EV battery temperature ===
The engine temperature tell-tale is usually installed singly, but has less commonly been installed in pairs. A pair of lights indicate insufficient (cold, blue) and excessive (hot, red) engine temperature. A single light usually indicates only an overheat condition in engine. In electric cars, it is usually to monitor the EV battery temperature and indicate the EV battery is overheating or is too cold to operate. One example is in a Nissan Leaf EV.

=== Malfunction indicator (check engine/hybrid/EV system) ===
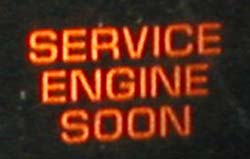
A malfunction indicator lamp

A "malfunction indicator lamp" (MIL) or "check engine light" (CEL) illuminates, usually in red, amber, or yellow, to indicate malfunction or a service requirement detected by the computerized engine management system. It is found on the instrument console of most automobiles. In the United States, an MIL with specified functions is required by environmental protection regulations. Unlike other types of idiot light, an MIL does not correspond to a condition that would have been read out on a gauge.

On vehicles equipped with OBD-II, the light has two stages: it illuminates steadily to indicate a minor fault such as a loose gas cap or malfunction with the vehicle's emissions controls, and it flashes when a severe condition is detected to alert the driver that continued driving may cause severe damage to the engine or catalytic converter emission control system. The MIL can present a legend, such as check engine, power limited, engine, or service engine soon; or it also can present a pictogram of an engine.

In hybrid and electric cars, a fault with the hybrid/EV system shows the pictogram of the vehicle with the exclamation point to indicate a fault with the electric motor and/or hybrid/EV battery (in fuel cell cars, it is also to determine a fault with the hydrogen fuel cell)

=== Charging system ===
An idiot light can indicate that the vehicle's alternator or generator is not properly charging the battery. The battery will then discharge, disabling the car. The light normally appears when the vehicle ignition is turned on, but the engine is not running, as it detects that no power is coming from the alternator (the alternator is powered off the engine so only generates when the engine is running). It subsequently extinguishes as soon as the engine starts and the alternator starts generating electricity. This light presents a pictogram of a battery, or it presents the legend amp or batt or gen.

=== Trouble indicator ===
Some vehicles had a single indicator labeled trouble or engine; this was not a Check Engine Light, but a catch-all warning light to indicate trouble that was serious enough to portend an imminent breakdown. Early 1980s Fords, such as the LTD Crown Victoria, without the instrument option, had only this light, which indicated low oil pressure, overheating and carburetion problems without distinguishing among them. This usage of the "engine" light was discontinued in the mid-1980s to prevent confusion with the MIL.

=== Brake ===
Many vehicles have a red tell-tale to indicate that the parking brake is engaged or that there is a fault with the vehicle's braking system. This tell-tale in most cases bears the ISO symbols for a parking brake and for a braking system emergency. In the past, US regulations required this tell-tale to bear the legend brake.

Vehicles with anti-lock braking system (ABS) have a lamp to indicate a detected failure.

=== Tire pressure ===
Tire pressure monitoring systems are often mandated by law. As a cost-saving measure, individual readouts for each tire are often substituted with a single tell-tale indicator for all tires.

== Other systems ==
Dashboard indicator lights or tell-tales are provided for turn signals, high beam, transmission mode in automatic transmission vehicles, and similar devices. These indicate running status and are not an indication of a fault.

As automobiles became increasingly complex, more dashboard indicator lights have been added for the status of safety and convenience systems. Lights can indicate many conditions including:

- Low fuel/charge or re-fuel/re-charge – Appears when vehicle's fuel tank is nearing empty. Usually shaped like a gas dispenser, or a light next to "E" on the fuel gauge, and (most later cars) a buzzer. In an EV when the battery runs low, usually shaped with the EV charger symbol or the EV battery symbol and in most cases a buzzer or chime. Sometimes a "power low warning" indicator is displayed usually shaped like a turtle with a outline circle when the EV battery is critically low. In a plug-in hybrid (PHEV) when the battery is depleted and vehicle runs low on fuel, both indicators may show indicating to recharge and to refuel.
- Glowplugs operating or wait to start (most diesel engines) – Appears when the engine is switched on to indicate the engine glow plugs are operating, and the driver should wait for the light to extinguish before starting the engine. Usually shaped like a coiled cord.
- Fasten driver or passenger seat-belt (usually with a buzzer) – Appears when the engine is switched and the driver's and/or passenger's seat belt is not buckled. A pressure sensor in the passenger seat prevents the passenger warning light from activating if the seat is unoccupied. Usually shaped like a person wearing a seat belt.
- Traction control anti-skid system operative
- Low windshield washer fluid
- Air-bag system malfunction detected
- Water in fuel (most diesel engines)
- Door open (usually indicated as door ajar), or trunk lid open (usually with a buzzer)
- Anti-theft alarm/engine immobilizer active (most later cars)
- Speed radar detected
- Automatic transmission fault
- Low tire pressure
- Modes of the heating/air conditioning system (defrost, recirculation, and others)
- Cruise control on (shaped like a gauge with an arrow on the needle in most later cars)
- Autopilot/self driving mode active
- EV light (hybrids/PHEVs) to determine if vehicle is in electric operation and engine shut off.
- Eco light (newer cars) indicates that vehicle is in efficient/fuel-saving operation
- Eco/comfort/sport mode – Driving modes to drive economically or for excitement
- Electronic Power Control (EPC) indicating a problem with the engine's throttle or other electronic control systems.
