= Drum brake =

Type of vehicle brake

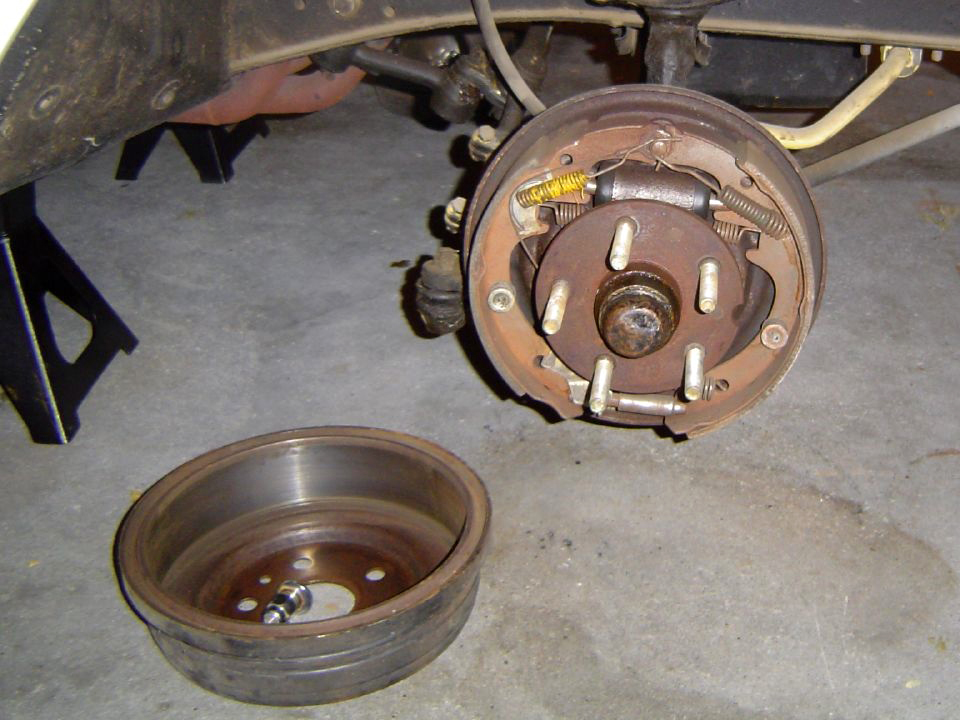
Drum brake (upper right) with the drum removed (lower left, inside facing up), on the front of a Ford Falcon Sprint

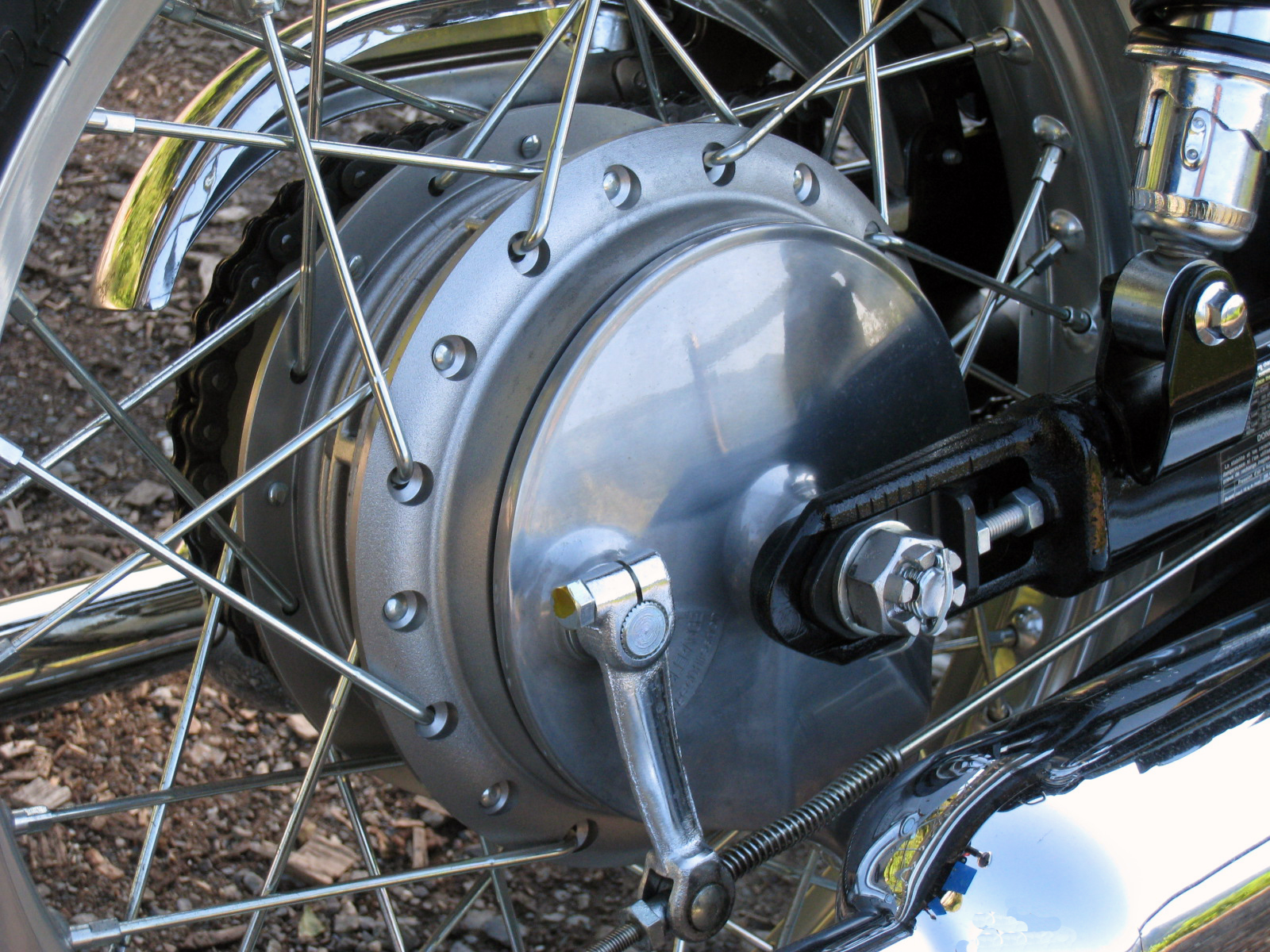
A rear drum brake on a Kawasaki W800 motorcycle

A drum brake is a brake that uses friction caused by a set of shoes or pads that press outward against a rotating bowl-shaped part called a brake drum.

The term drum brake usually means a brake in which shoes press on the inner surface of the drum. When shoes press on the outside of the drum, it is usually called a clasp brake. Where the drum is pinched between two shoes, similar to a conventional disc brake, it is sometimes called a pinch drum brake, though such brakes are relatively rare. A related type called a band brake uses a flexible belt or "band" wrapping around the outside of a drum. Drum brakes are manufactured in small automobiles or cheap vehicles, as they are less expensive to make than a traditional disc brake.

== History ==
Several schemes of drum brake operation; the distribution force during the braking phase is highlighted in black.

The modern automobile drum brake was first used in a car made by Maybach in 1900, although the principle was only later patented in 1902 by Louis Renault. He used woven asbestos lining for the drum brake lining, as no alternative material dissipated heat more effectively, though Maybach had used a less sophisticated drum brake. In the first drum brakes, levers and rods or cables operated the shoes mechanically. From the mid-1930s, oil pressure in a small wheel cylinder and pistons (as in the picture) operated the brakes, though some vehicles continued with purely mechanical systems for decades. Some designs have two wheel cylinders.

As the shoes in drum brakes wear, brakes required regular manual adjustment until the introduction of self-adjusting drum brakes in the 1950s. Drum brakes are also prone to brake fade with repeated use.

Jaguar Cars fielded three cars equipped with disc brakes at Le Mans in 1953, where they won, in large part due to their superior braking over drum-equipped rivals. This spelled the beginning of the end for drum brakes in passenger cars. From the 1960s to the 1980s, disc brakes gradually replaced drum brakes on the front wheels of cars (which receive the majority of braking force). Now practically all cars use disc brakes on the front wheels, and many use disc brakes on all four wheels.

In the United States, the Jeep CJ-5 (manufactured by AM General) was the final automobile (produced for the United States Postal Service) to use front drum brakes when it was phased out in 1986. However, drum brakes are still often used on the rear wheels, and for parking brakes. Some vehicles utilize a "drum-in-hat" parking brake, where the brake shoes are arranged inside the center portion (hat) of a disc brake rotor, which acts as the drum.

Early brake shoes contained asbestos. After the United States Federal Government began to regulate asbestos production, brake manufacturers had to switch to non-asbestos linings. Owners initially complained of poor braking with the replacements, but brake technology eventually advanced to compensate. A majority of daily-driven older vehicles have been fitted with asbestos-free linings. Many other countries have also prohibited the use of asbestos in brakes.

== Components ==
Drum brake components include the backing plate, brake drum, shoe, wheel cylinder, and various springs and pins.

=== Backing plate ===
The backing plate provides a base for the other components. The back plate also increases the rigidity of whole set-up, supports the housing, and protects it from foreign materials like dust and other road debris. It absorbs the torque from the braking action, and that is why back plate is also called the "Torque Plate". Since all braking operations exert pressure on the backing plate, it must be strong and wear-resistant. Levers for emergency or parking brakes, and automatic brake-shoe adjuster were also added in recent years.

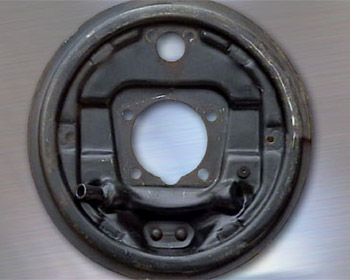
Back plate made in the pressing shop.

=== Brake drum ===
The brake drum is generally made of a special type of cast iron that is heat-conductive and wear-resistant. It rotates with the wheel and axle. When a driver applies the brakes, the lining pushes radially against the inner surface of the drum, and the ensuing friction slows or stops rotation of the wheel and axle, and thus the vehicle. This friction generates substantial heat.

=== Wheel cylinder ===
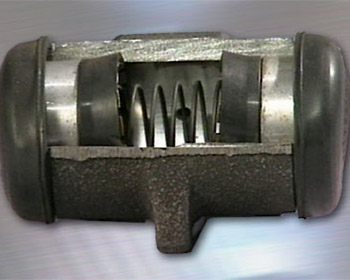
Cut-away section of a wheel cylinder.

One wheel cylinder operates the brake on each wheel. Two pistons operate the shoes, one at each end of the wheel cylinder. The leading shoe (closest to the front of the vehicle) is known as the primary shoe. The trailing shoe is known as the secondary shoe. Hydraulic pressure from the master cylinder acts on the piston cup, pushing the pistons toward the shoes, forcing them against the drum. When the driver releases the brakes, the brake shoe springs restore the shoes to their original (disengaged) position. The parts of the wheel cylinder are shown to the right.

=== Brake shoe ===
Brake shoes are typically made of two pieces of steel welded together. The friction material is either riveted to the lining table or attached with adhesive. The crescent-shaped piece is called the Web and contains holes and slots in different shapes for return springs, hold-down hardware, parking brake linkage and self-adjusting components. All the application force of the wheel cylinder is applied through the web to the lining table and brake lining. The edge of the lining table generally has three V-shaped notches or tabs on each side called nibs. The nibs rest against the support pads of the backing plate to which the shoes are installed. Each brake assembly has two shoes, a primary and secondary. The primary shoe is located toward the front of the vehicle and has the lining positioned differently from the secondary shoe. Quite often, the two shoes are interchangeable, so close inspection for any variation is important.

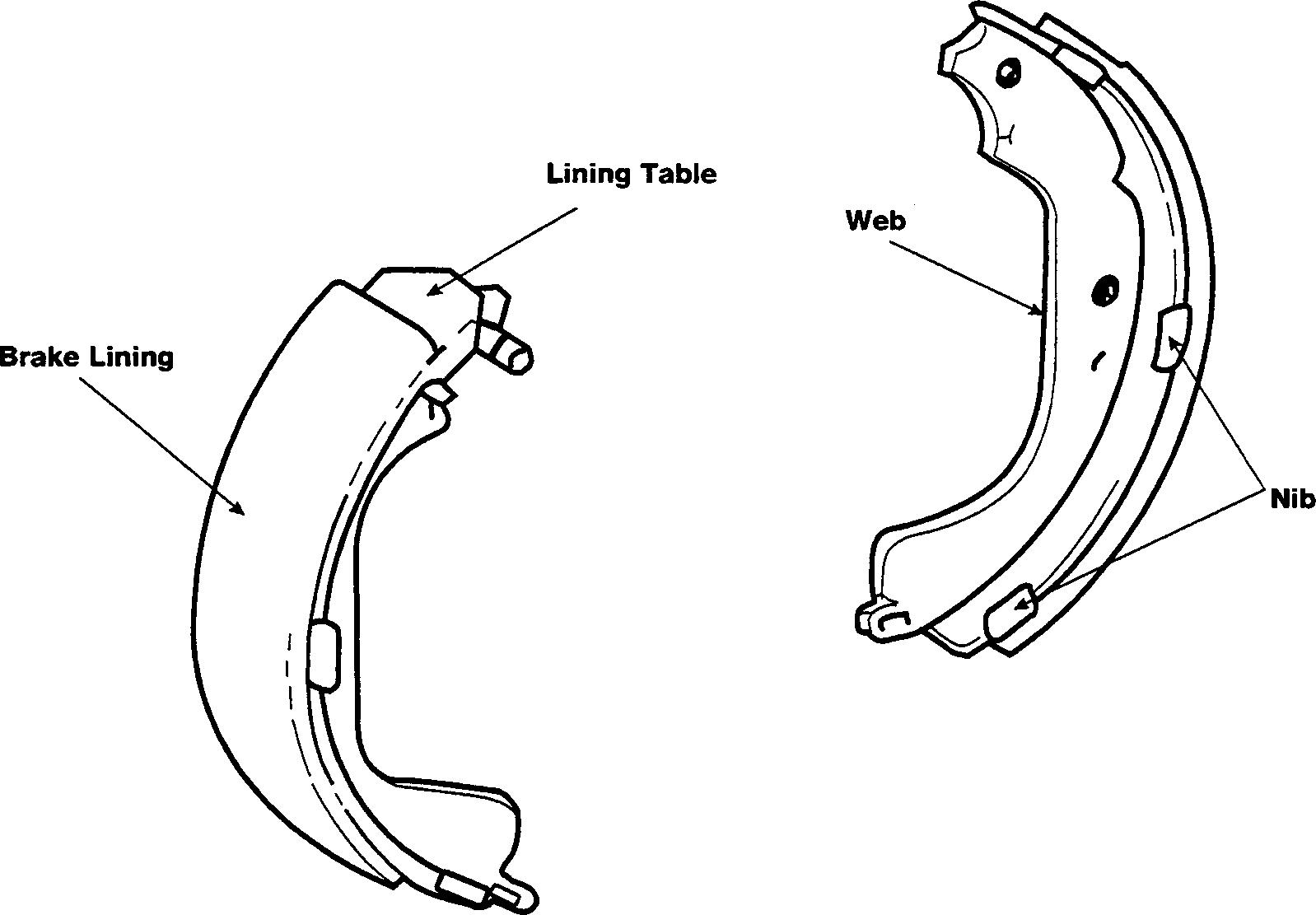
Brake shoe assembly

Linings must be resistant to heat and wear and have a high friction coefficient unaffected by fluctuations in temperature and humidity. Materials that make up the brake shoe lining include, friction modifiers (which can include graphite and cashew nut shells), powdered metal such as lead, zinc, brass, aluminium and other metals that resist heat fade, binders, curing agents and fillers such as rubber chips to reduce brake noise.

In the UK two common grades of brake shoe material used to be available. DON 202 was a high friction material that did not require a brake power servo. The disadvantage was that the lining was prone to fading on steep hills. A harder lining, the famous VG95 was produced but this required a brake servo. The other snag was that the parking brake would often fail the annual MOT test unless the high friction linings were installed just for the test.

== In operation ==
=== Normal braking ===
When the brakes are applied, brake fluid is forced under pressure from the master cylinder into the wheel cylinder, which in turn pushes the brake shoes into contact with the machined surface on the inside of the drum. This rubbing action reduces the rotation of the brake drum, which is coupled to the wheel. Hence the speed of the vehicle is reduced. When the pressure is released, return springs pull the shoes back to their rest position.

=== Automatic self-adjustment ===
As the brake linings wear, the shoes must travel a greater distance to reach the drum. In systems fitted with automatic adjusters, when the distance reaches a certain point, a self-adjusting mechanism automatically reacts by adjusting the rest position of the shoes so that they are closer to the drum. Here, the adjusting lever rocks enough to advance the adjuster gear by one tooth. The adjuster has threads on it, like a bolt, so that it unscrews a little bit when it turns, lengthening to fill in the gap. When the brake shoes wear a little more, the adjuster can advance again, so it always keeps the shoes close to the drum. Typically the adjusters only operate when the vehicle is going in reverse and the brakes are engaged.

On vehicles without automatic adjusters, it is required to periodically manually adjust the brakes to take up any excess gap between the shoes and the drum.

=== Parking/emergency brake ===
The parking (or emergency) brake system controls the brakes through a series of steel cables that are connected to either a hand lever or a foot pedal. The idea is that the system is fully mechanical and completely bypasses the hydraulic system so that the vehicle can be brought to a stop even if there is a total brake failure. Here the cable pulls on a lever mounted in the brake and is directly connected to the brake shoes. This has the effect of bypassing the wheel cylinder and controlling the brakes directly.

== Self-applying characteristic ==
Drum brakes have a natural "self-applying" characteristic, better known as "self-energizing." The rotation of the drum can drag either one or both of the shoes into the friction surface, causing the brakes to bite harder, which increases the force holding them together. This increases the stopping power without any additional effort being expended by the driver, but it does make it harder for the driver to modulate the brake's sensitivity. It also makes the brake more sensitive to brake fade, as a decrease in brake friction also reduces the amount of brake assist.

Disc brakes exhibit no self-applying effect because the hydraulic pressure acting on the pads is perpendicular to the direction of rotation of the disc. Disc brake systems usually have servo assistance ("Brake Booster") to lessen the driver's pedal effort, but some disc braked cars (notably race cars) and smaller brakes for motorcycles, etc., do not need to use servos.

== Drum brake designs ==
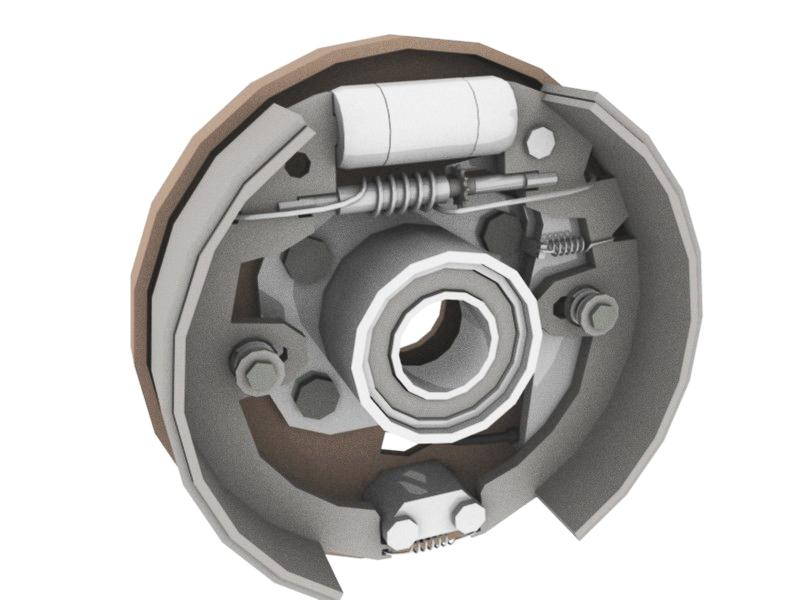
Rendering of a drum brake

Drum brakes are typically described as either leading/trailing (also called "single leading") or twin leading.

Rear drum brakes are typically of a leading/trailing design (for non-servo systems), or primary/secondary (for duo servo systems), the shoes being moved by a single double-acting hydraulic cylinder and hinged at the same point. In this design, one of the brake shoes always experiences the self-applying effect, irrespective of whether the vehicle is moving forwards or backwards. This is particularly useful on the rear brakes, where the parking brake (handbrake or footbrake) must exert enough force to stop the vehicle from traveling backwards and hold it on a slope. Provided the contact area of the brake shoes is large enough, which isn't always the case, the self-applying effect can securely hold a vehicle when the weight is transferred to the rear brakes due to the incline of a slope or the reverse direction of motion. A further advantage of using a single hydraulic cylinder on the rear is that the opposite pivot may be made in the form of a double-lobed cam that is rotated by the action of the parking brake system.

Front drum brakes may be of either design in practice, but the twin leading design is more effective. This design uses two actuating cylinders arranged so that both shoes use the self-applying characteristic when the vehicle is moving forwards. The brake shoes pivot at opposite points to each other. This gives the maximum possible braking when moving forwards, but is not so effective when the vehicle is traveling in reverse.

The optimum arrangement of twin leading front brakes with leading/trailing brakes on the rear allows more braking force at the front of the vehicle when it is moving forwards, with less at the rear. This helps prevent the rear wheels from locking up, but still provides adequate braking at the rear.

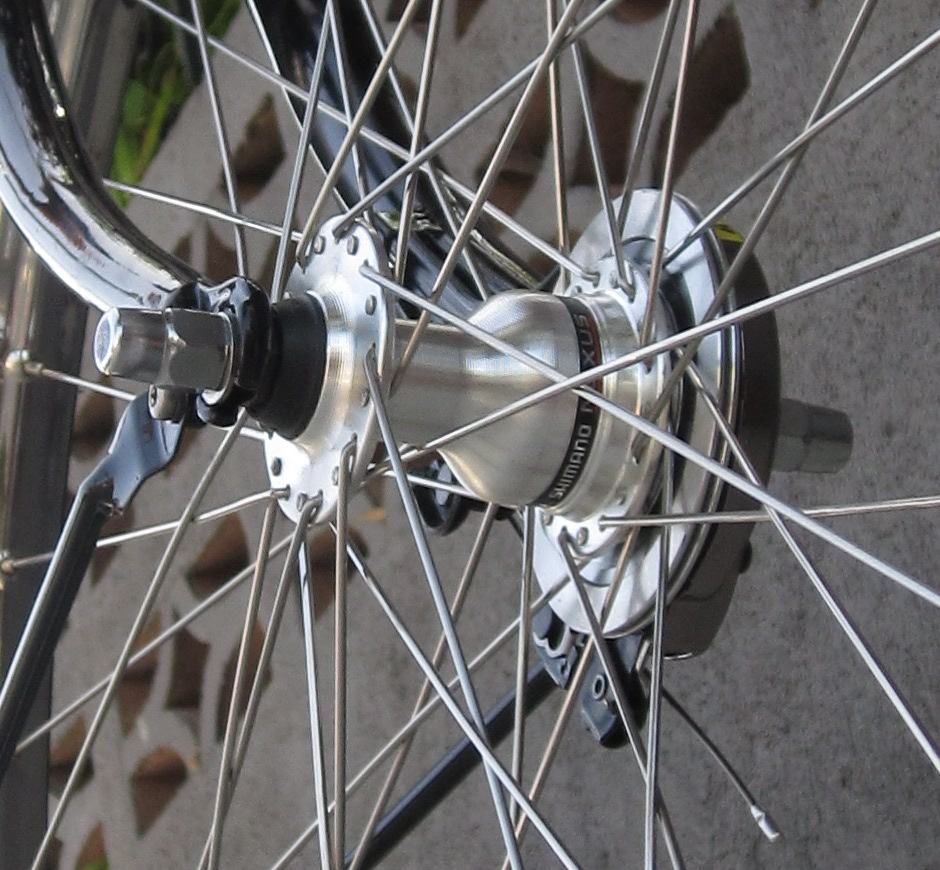
Shimano Nexus front hub with roller brake

Because aluminum wears more easily than iron, aluminum drums frequently have an iron or steel liner on the inner surface of the drum, bonded or riveted to the aluminum outer shell.

== Advantages ==
Drum brakes are used in most heavy duty trucks, buses, some medium and light duty trucks, and a few cars, dirt bikes, ATVs, and a few smaller recreational vehicles like electric scooters. Drum brakes are often applied to the rear wheels since most of the stopping force is generated by the front brakes of the vehicle, and therefore, the heat generated in the rear is significantly less. Drum brakes allow simple incorporation of a parking brake.

Drum brakes are also occasionally fitted as the parking (and emergency) brake even when the rear wheels use disc brakes as the main brakes. Many rear disc braking systems use a parking brake in which the piston in the caliper is actuated by a cam or screw. This compresses the pads against the rotor. However, this type of system becomes much more complicated when the rear disc brakes use fixed, multi-piston calipers. In this situation, a small drum is usually fitted within or as part of the brake disc. This type of brake is also known as a banksia brake.

In hybrid and electric vehicle applications, wear on braking systems is greatly reduced by energy recovering motor–generators (see regenerative braking), so some hybrid vehicles such as the Toyota Prius (prior to the third generation) and Volkswagen ID.3 and ID.4 use drum brakes at the rear wheels.

Disc brakes rely on pliability of caliper seals and slight runout to release pads, leading to drag, fuel mileage loss, and disc scoring. Drum brake return springs give more positive action and, adjusted correctly, often have less drag when released. It is however possible to design special seals that retract the piston on a disc brake.

Drum brakes emit less particulate matter (PM) than disc brakes, as the wear-particles are mostly sealed in. They are not better in this regard than frictionless brakes though.

Certain heavier-duty drum brake systems compensate for load when determining wheel cylinder pressure; a feature which is rare when discs are employed (hydropneumatic suspension systems as employed on Citroën vehicles adjust brake pressure depending on load regardless of if drum or discs are used). One such vehicle is the Jeep Comanche. The Comanche can automatically send more pressure to the rear drums depending on the size of the load. Most other brands have used load sensing valves in the hydraulics to the rear axle for decades.

Due to the fact that a drum brake's friction contact area is at the circumference of the brake, a drum brake can provide more braking force than an equal diameter disc brake. The increased friction contact area of drum brake shoes on the drum allows drum brake shoes to last longer than disc brake pads used in a brake system of similar dimensions and braking force. Drum brakes retain heat and are more complex than disc brakes, but are often the more economical and powerful brake type to use in rear brake applications due to the low heat generation of rear brakes, a drum brake's self-applying nature, larger friction surface contact area, and long life wear characteristics (% life used / kW of braking power).

To list advantages of drum brakes:

- less expensive to produce.
- slightly lower frequency of maintenance due to better corrosion resistance compared to disks.
- built-in self energizing effect requires less input force (such as hydraulic pressure).
- wheel cylinders are somewhat simpler to recondition compared to calipers.
- minor weight savings, primarily from much smaller and lighter hydraulic cylinders vs. calipers.

== As a driveshaft parking/emergency brake ==
Drum brakes have also been built onto the transmission's driveshaft as parking brakes (e.g., Chryslers through 1962). This provides the advantage that it is completely independent of the service brakes—but suffers a severe disadvantage in that, when used with a bumper jack (common in that era) on the rear, and without proper wheel blocks, the differential's action can allow the vehicle to roll off the jack.

Land Rover have used a drum brake on the gearbox output shaft for over fifty years. The advantage is that all four wheels can be braked with the parking brake.

== Disadvantages ==
Drum brakes, like most other brakes, convert kinetic energy into heat by friction. This heat should dissipate into the surrounding air, but can just as easily transfer to other braking system components. Brake drums must be large to cope with the massive forces involved, and must be able to absorb and dissipate a lot of heat. Heat transfer to air can be aided by incorporating cooling fins onto the drum, or even drilling holes around the drum's circumference. However, excessive heating can occur due to heavy or repeated braking, which can cause the drum to distort, leading to vibration under braking.

The other consequence of overheating is brake fade. This is due to one of several processes, or more usually an accumulation of all of them.

1. When internally-expanding brake drums are heated by hard braking, the diameter of the drum increases slightly due to thermal expansion, so the shoes must move farther and the driver must press the brake pedal farther.
2. The properties of the friction material can change if heated, resulting in less friction. This can be a much larger problem with drum brakes than disc brakes, since the shoes are inside the drum and not exposed to cooling ambient air. The loss of friction is usually only temporary and the material regains its efficiency when cooled, but if the surface overheats to the point where it becomes glazed the reduction in braking efficiency will become more permanent. Surface glazing can be worn away with further use of the brakes, but that takes time.
3. Excessive brake drum heating can cause the brake fluid to vaporize, which reduces the hydraulic pressure applied to the brake shoes. Therefore, the brakes provide less deceleration for a given amount of pressure on the pedal. The effect is worsened by poor maintenance. Brake fluid that is old and has absorbed moisture has a lower boiling point, so brake fade occurs sooner.

Brake fade is not always due to overheating. Water between the friction surfaces and the drum can act as a lubricant and reduce braking efficiency. The water tends to stay until heated sufficiently to vaporize, at which point braking efficiency returns. All friction braking systems have a maximum theoretical rate of energy conversion. Once that rate is reached, applying greater pedal pressure doesn't change it—in fact, the effects mentioned can substantially reduce it. Ultimately, this is what brake fade is, regardless of the mechanisms of its causes. Disc brakes are not immune to any of these processes, but they deal with heat and water more effectively than drums.

Drum brakes can be grabby if the drum surface gets light rust or if the brake is cold and damp, giving the pad material greater friction. Grabbing can be so severe that the tires skid and continue to skid even when the pedal is released. Grab is the opposite of fade: when the pad friction goes up, the self-assisting nature of drum brakes causes application force to go up. If the pad friction and self-amplification are high enough, the brake stays engaged due to self-application, even when the external application force is released.

While disc brake rotors can be machined to clean the friction surface (i.e., 'turning'), the same generally cannot be done with brake drums. Machining the friction surface of a brake drum increases the diameter, which might require oversized shoes to maintain proper contact with the drum. However, since oversized shoes are generally unavailable for most applications, worn or damaged drums generally must be replaced.

It is quite simple to machine brake drums if one has a slow running lathe (one rule of thumb is that cast iron should not be machined faster than fifty feet per minute). Usually it is only necessary to machine away the ridge that forms that makes brake drum removal difficult, especially if the brakes are self-adjusting. In severe cases the ridge can make the brake drum captive, however most drum brake designs provide a way to externally release the self-adjusting mechanism in order to ease drum removal and service.

Another disadvantage of drum brakes is their relative complexity. A person must have a general understanding of how drum brakes work and take several simple steps to ensure the brakes are reassembled correctly when doing work on drum brakes. And, as a result of this increased complexity (compared to disc brakes), maintenance of drum brakes is generally more time-consuming. Also, the greater number of parts results in a greater number of failure modes compared to disc brakes. Springs can break from fatigue if not replaced along with worn brake shoes. And the drum and shoes can become damaged from scoring if various components (such as broken springs or self-adjusters) break and become loose inside the drum.

Catastrophic failure of hardware such as springs and adjusters can also cause unintended brake application or even wheel lockup. If springs break, the shoes will be free to fall against the rotating drum, essentially causing the brakes to be applied. Because of the self-energizing qualities of drum brakes, the unrestrained shoes can even potentially cause the brakes to grab to the point of locking up the wheel. Also, broken pieces of springs and other hardware (like adjusters) can become lodged between the shoes and drum, resulting in unintended application of the brakes (and, as stated above, damage to brake components). For these reasons, brake hardware (such as springs and clips) should always be replaced with brake shoes.

Also, drum brakes do not apply immediately when the wheel cylinders are pressurized, because the force of the return springs must be overcome before the shoes start to move towards the drum. This means that the very common hybrid disc/drum systems only brake with the (nearly always front) discs on light pedal pressure unless extra hardware is added. In practice, a metering valve prevents hydraulic pressure from reaching the front calipers until pressure rises enough to overcome the return springs in the drum brakes. If the metering valve were left out, the vehicle would stop only with the front discs unless the driver used enough brake pedal pressure to overcome the return spring pressure on the rear shoes.

== Safety ==
When asbestos was common in drum brakes, there was a danger workers repairing or replacing them would breathe asbestos fibers, which can cause mesothelioma. Asbestos fibers would break off or become separated over time and with the high temperatures induced by braking. Wet brushes and aerosol sprays were commonly used to reduce dust. Safety regulators sometimes recommended using vacuum hoses to suck away the dust, or enclosures with interior lighting and space to use tools inside them, but these were rare and cumbersome. Distinctive shoes designed to protect against asbestos were also recommended. There is evidence that auto mechanics had disproportionate levels of mesothelioma.

Those who do maintenance work on brakes can also be exposed to the solvents 1,1,1-trichloroethane and 2-butoxyethanol (a main ingredient in Greasoff No. 19). Exposure to these solvents can cause irritation, including to the eyes and mucous membranes. Exposure to 1-1-1-trichloroethane vapors can cause central nervous system damage, dizziness, incoordination, drowsiness, and increased reaction time.

== Re-arcing ==
Before 1984, it was common to re-arc brake shoes to match the arc within brake drums. This practice was controversial however, as it removed friction material from the brakes, reduced the life of the shoes and created hazardous asbestos dust. After 1984, the current design theory was altered, to use shoes for the proper diameter drum, and to simply replace the brake drum when necessary, rather than re-arc the shoes.

== Use in music ==
The brake drum has found popular use as a percussion instrument. This was likely first implemented in a 1939 composition First Construction (in Metal) by American avant-garde musician John Cage. In more recent times the brake drum has become associated with the front ensemble as used in the marching arts.

== See also ==
- Balancing machine
- Bicycle drum brakes
- Brake bleeding
- Brake lining
- Electric friction brake
- Hydraulic disc brakes
- List of auto parts
