= Pascal's law =

Principle in fluid mechanics

Hydraulic lifting and pressing devices

Pascal's law (also Pascal's principle or the principle of transmission of fluid-pressure) is a principle in fluid mechanics that states that a pressure change at any point in a confined incompressible fluid is transmitted throughout the fluid such that the same change occurs everywhere. The law was established by French mathematician Blaise Pascal in 1653 and published in 1663.

== Definition ==
Pressure in water and air. Pascal's law applies for fluids.

Pascal's principle is defined as:

A change in pressure at any point in an enclosed incompressible fluid at rest is transmitted equally and undiminished to all points in all directions throughout the fluid, and the force due to the pressure acts at right angles to the enclosing walls.

=== Fluid column with gravity ===
For a fluid column in a uniform gravity (e.g. in a hydraulic press), this principle can be stated mathematically as:

$$\Delta p = \rho g \cdot\Delta h\,$$
where

- $\Delta p$ is the hydrostatic pressure (given in pascals in the SI system), or the difference in pressure at two points within a fluid column, due to the weight of the fluid);
- ρ is the fluid density (in kilograms per cubic meter in the SI system);
- g is acceleration due to gravity (normally using the sea level acceleration due to Earth's gravity, in meters per second squared);
- $\Delta h$ is the height of fluid above the point of measurement, or the difference in elevation between the two points within the fluid column (in meters).

The intuitive explanation of this formula is that the change in pressure between two elevations is due to the weight of the fluid between the elevations. Note that the variation with height does not depend on any additional pressures. Therefore, Pascal's law can be interpreted as saying that any change in pressure applied at any given point of the fluid is transmitted undiminished throughout the fluid.

The formula is a specific case of Navier–Stokes equations without inertia and viscosity terms.

== Applications ==
If an oscillating U-tube is filled with water and pistons are placed at each end, pressure exerted by the left piston will be transmitted throughout the liquid and against the bottom of the right piston. (The pistons are simply "plugs" that can slide freely but snugly inside the tube.) The pressure that the left piston exerts against the water will be exactly equal to the pressure the water exerts against the right piston $p_1 = p_2$. By using $p = \frac FA$ we get $\frac{F_1}{A_1} = \frac{F_2}{A_2} \Leftrightarrow \frac{F_2}{F_1} = \frac{A_2}{A_1}$. Suppose the tube on the right side is made 50 times wider $\frac{A_2}{A_1} = 50$. If a 1 N load is placed on the left piston ($F_1 = 1N$), an additional pressure due to the weight of the load is transmitted throughout the liquid and up against the right piston. This additional pressure on the right piston will cause an upward force $F_2 = F_1 \frac{A_2}{A_1} = 50N$ which is 50 times bigger than the force on the left piston. The difference between force and pressure is important: the additional pressure is exerted against the entire area of the larger piston. Since there is 50 times the area, 50 times as much force is exerted on the larger piston. Thus, the larger piston will support a 50 N load – fifty times the load on the smaller piston.

Forces can be multiplied using such a device. One newton input produces 50 newtons output. By further increasing the area of the larger piston (or reducing the area of the smaller piston), forces can be multiplied, in principle, by any amount. Pascal's principle underlies the operation of the hydraulic press. The hydraulic press does not violate energy conservation, because a decrease in distance moved compensates for the increase in force. When the small piston is moved downward 100 centimeters, the large piston will be raised only one-fiftieth of this, or 2 centimeters. The input force multiplied by the distance moved by the smaller piston is equal to the output force multiplied by the distance moved by the larger piston; this is one more example of a simple machine operating on the same principle as a mechanical lever.

A typical application of Pascal's principle for gases and liquids is the automobile lift seen in many service stations (the hydraulic jack). Increased air pressure produced by an air compressor is transmitted through the air to the surface of oil in an underground reservoir. The oil, in turn, transmits the pressure to a piston, which lifts the automobile. The relatively low pressure that exerts the lifting force against the piston is about the same as the air pressure in automobile tires. Hydraulics is employed by modern devices ranging from very small to enormous. For example, there are hydraulic pistons in almost all construction machines where heavy loads are involved.

Other applications:

- Force amplification in the braking system of most motor vehicles.
- Used in artesian wells, water towers, and dams.
- Scuba divers must understand this principle. Starting from normal atmospheric pressure, about 100 kilopascal, the pressure increases by about 100 kPa for each increase of 10 m depth.
- Usually Pascal's rule is applied to confined space (static flow), but due to the continuous flow process, Pascal's principle can be applied to the lift oil mechanism (which can be represented as a U tube with pistons on either end).

== Pascal's barrel ==
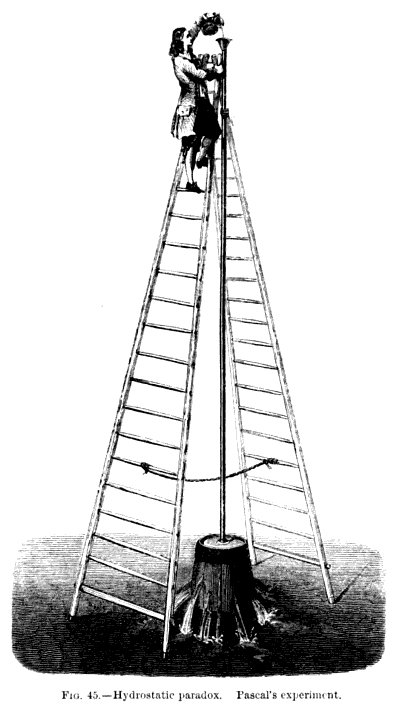
An illustration of Pascal's barrel experiment from The forces of nature by Amédée Guillemin (1872)

Pascal's barrel is the name of a hydrostatics experiment allegedly performed by Blaise Pascal in 1646. In the experiment, Pascal supposedly inserted a long vertical tube into an (otherwise sealed) barrel filled with water. When water was poured into the vertical tube, the increase in hydrostatic pressure caused the barrel to burst.

The experiment is mentioned nowhere in Pascal's preserved works and it may be apocryphal, attributed to him by 19th-century French authors, among whom the experiment is known as crève-tonneau ("barrel-buster"); nevertheless the experiment remains associated with Pascal in many elementary physics textbooks.

== See also ==
- Hydrostatic paradox – Variation in pressure as a function of elevation
- Ruina montium – Roman mining technique
