= Wheel cylinder =

Hydraulic drum brake system

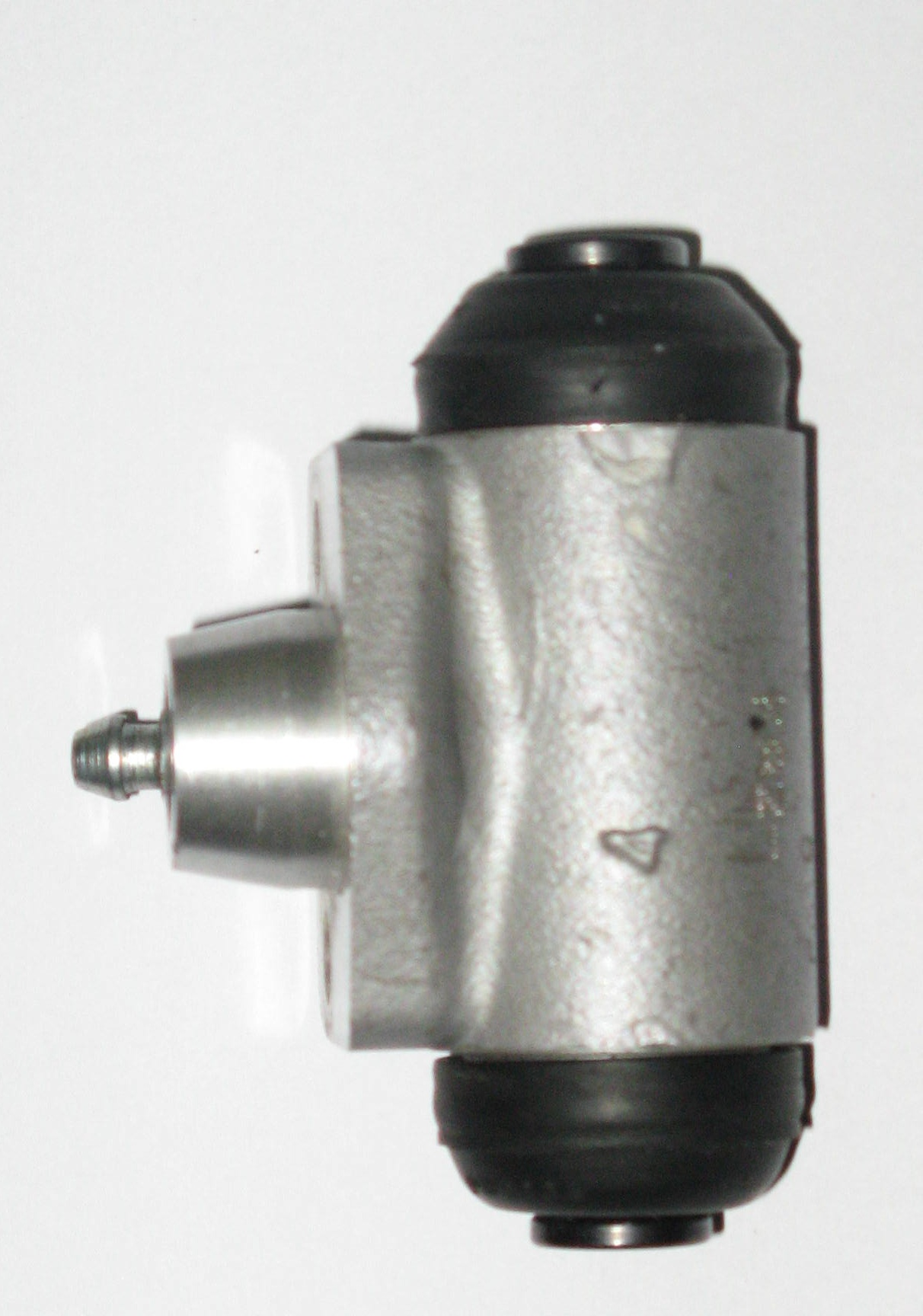
Wheel cylinder assembly

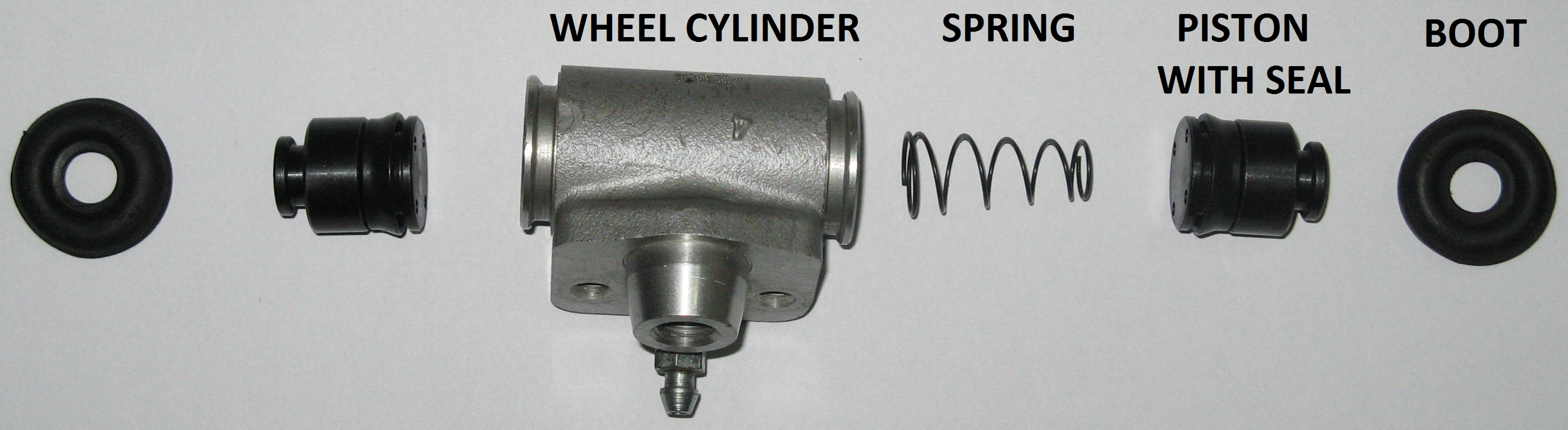
Wheel cylinder child parts

A wheel cylinder is a component of a hydraulic drum brake system. It is located in each wheel and is usually positioned at the top of the wheel, above the shoes. Its function is to exert force onto the shoes so as to bring them into contact with the drum and stop the vehicle with friction. The wheel cylinders are usually connected to the shoes with small bird-beak shaped rods. Wheel cylinders were first invented by Bendix in 1958.

It is very similar to a slave cylinder and functions in much the same way, internally consisting of only a simple plunger. On older vehicles, these may begin to leak and hinder the performance of the brakes. They are, however, normally inexpensive and relatively easy to replace.

The wheel cylinder consists of a cylinder that has two pistons, one on each side. Each piston has a rubber seal and a shaft that connects the piston with a brake shoe. When brake pressure is applied, the pistons are forced out, pushing the shoes into contact with the drum. Some designs use two single piston wheel cylinders, one at the top of the drum and one at the bottom, each connected to one brake shoe.

Wheel cylinders must be rebuilt or replaced if they show signs of leaking. Wheel cylinders used to be made of cast iron. However, they were more prone to rusting and aluminium is now the preferred material.

It has a cylinder, two pistons, two rubber cups and a spring. The fluid presses against the pistons that move outward in the cylinder. When the pistons come closer, the liquid is forced into the master cylinder, the spring between the two pistons holds the rubber cups in positions.

== See also ==
- List of auto parts
