= Brake fade =

Reduction in vehicle stopping power

Brake fade (or vehicle braking system fade) is the reduction in stopping power that can occur after repeated or sustained application of the brakes of a vehicle, especially in high load or high speed conditions. Brake fade can be a factor in any vehicle that uses a friction braking system including automobiles, trucks, motorcycles, airplanes, and bicycles.

Brake fade is caused by a buildup of heat in the braking surfaces and the subsequent changes and reactions in the brake system components and can be experienced with both drum brakes and disc brakes. Loss of stopping power, or fade, can be caused by friction fade, mechanical fade, or fluid fade. Brake fade can be significantly reduced by appropriate equipment and materials design and selection, as well as good cooling.

Brake fade occurs most often during high performance driving or when going down a long, steep hill. It is more prevalent in drum brakes due to their configuration. Disc brakes are much more resistant to brake fade because the heat can be vented away from the rotor and pads more easily, and have come to be a standard feature in front brakes for most vehicles.

== Causes of brake fade ==
The reduction of friction termed brake fade is caused when the temperature reaches the "kneepoint" on the temperature-friction curve and gas builds up between disc and pad. All brake linings are cured under mechanical pressure following a heating and cooling curve backstroke, heating the friction material up to 232 °C (450 °F) to "cure" (cross-link) the phenolic resin thermoset polymers: There is no melting of the binding resins, because phenolic resins are thermoset, not thermoplastic. In this form of fade, the brake pedal feels firm but there is reduced stopping ability. Fade can also be caused by the brake fluid boiling, with attendant release of compressible gases. In this type of fade, the brake pedal feels "spongy". This condition is worsened when there are contaminants in the fluid, such as water, which most types of brake fluids are prone to absorbing to varying degrees. For this reason brake fluid replacement is standard maintenance.

== Fade in self-assisting brakes ==
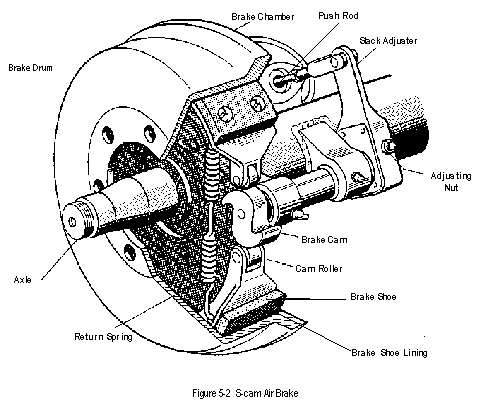
Truck air brakes can fade due to expansion if improperly adjusted.

Various brake designs such as band brakes and many drum brakes are self-assisting: when the brake is applied, some of the braking force feeds back into the brake mechanism to further self-apply the brake. This is called "positive feedback" or "self-servo". Self-assist reduces the input force needed to apply the brake, but exaggerates fade, since a reduction in pad friction material height or thickness also reduces pad force. In contrast, for a brake without self-assist, such as a conventional disc brake, a loss of pad friction material does not change the pad force, so there is no necessary loss in the brake torque reaction for a given amount of input force.

The self-assist mechanism affects the brake pump and the amount of fade. For example, the Ausco Lambert and Murphy brakes have self-assist roughly proportional to pad friction, so total braking is reduced as roughly the square of the loss in friction. Many other self-assist designs, such as band brakes and many common drum brakes, have exponential self-assist, described by $e^{\mu \theta}$, where $e$ is the natural logarithm base, $\mu$ is the coefficient of friction between shoes and drum, and $\theta$ is the angle of engagement between shoes and drum. A small change in friction causes an exponential change in self assist. In many common brakes, a slight increase in friction can lead to wheel lockup with even light application. For example, on damp mornings, drum brakes can lock on first application, skidding to a stop even after the brake pedal has been released. Conversely, a slight decrease in friction can lead to severe brake fade.

== Factors contributing to fade ==
Brake fade failures can cascade. For example, a typical 5-axle truck/trailer combination has 10 brakes. If one brake fades, brake load is transferred to the remaining 9 brakes, causing them to work harder, get hotter, and thus fade more. Where fade is non-uniform, fade may cause a vehicle to swerve. Because of this, heavy vehicles often use disproportionately weak brakes on steered wheels, which hurts the stopping distance and causes brakes on non-steered wheels to work harder, worsening fade. An advantage of low-fade brakes such as disc brakes is steered wheels can do more braking without causing brake steer.

Brake fade typically occurs during heavy or sustained braking. Many high-speed vehicles use disc brakes, and many European heavy vehicles use disc brakes. Many U.S. and third-world heavy vehicles use drum brakes due to their lower purchase price. On heavy vehicles, air drag is often small compared to the weight, so the brakes dissipate proportionally more energy than on a typical car or motorcycle. Thus, heavy vehicles often need to use engine compression braking, and slow down so braking energy is dissipated over a longer interval. Recent studies have been performed in the United States to test the stopping distances of both drum brakes and disc brakes using a North American Standard called FMVSS-121. The results showed that when newer compounding of friction materials typically used in disc brakes is applied to drum brakes that there is virtually no difference in stopping distance or brake fade. As the United States changed its FMVSS-121 rules for Class Eight trucks built in 2012 to reduce stopping distances by about 1/3rd there was no recommendation to use either drum or disc brakes in the current law.

Newer drum technologies and turbine cooling devices inside of these drums has also eliminated any edge disc brakes may have had in heavy duty applications. By installing brake turbines inside of a specially configured drum, temperatures are many times cut in half and brake fade is nearly eliminated.

Brake failure is also caused by brake drum thermal expansion in which brake shoe clearance becomes excessive from wear. This was largely remedied in the 1950s by self-adjusting brakes. Maladjustment with wear is still a factor in trucks with drum air brakes. A Canadian survey of randomly stopped heavy trucks found over 10% of trucks using self-adjusting brakes had at least one brake out of adjustment, due either to failure of the self-adjust mechanism or wear beyond the capacity of the self adjuster. Newer brake pistons ("cans") extend stroke from about 65 to 75 mm (2.6 to 3.0 in); since about 30 mm (1.2 in) of stroke is used just putting the pads in contact with the drum, the added 10 mm (0.4 in) of stroke is over 25% increase in useful stroke. Longer stroke reduces especially wear-related fade, but drum brakes are still fundamentally prone to fade when hot.

After cooling, faded brakes usually perform as well as before, with no visible change to the brake shoes and pads. However, if the brakes have been excessively hot for a prolonged period of time, glazing can occur on both of the friction linings of the shoes and pads.

When this happens, the contacting surfaces of the linings will have a smooth, shiny appearance, and will not perform as efficiently to slow the vehicle under braking. This glazing can be easily removed by either gently using emery paper on them, or by driving the vehicle carefully whilst implementing light use of the brakes for several miles.

Long dual-tire skid marks on highways, made by trucks with drum brakes, are visible examples of non-linearity between brake response and pedal pressure. Large trucks still use drum brakes because they are economical and fit easily where an equivalent disc brake does not. More recently, disc brakes for trucks have been promoted listing features such as no fade, possible because they have no self-assist (self-servo).

== Railroads ==
Railroads have been using disk brakes on passenger cars for more than 60 years, but coupled with a Rolokron anti-lock system to avoid the creation of flat spots (or so-called "square wheels") when wheels lock and skid on the rail surface (audible as a steady bang-bang-bang noise as a train goes by—not to be confused with the bang-bang...bang-bang...bang-bang sound made by wheels rolling over a rail joint). Usually, brake disks are installed in the center of the axle, but in some applications (such as Bombardier Bi Level commuter cars), only one disk is used, mounted on the axle end outside the truck frame. High speed trains (such as the TGV) may use four disks per axle.

Freight cars (and some passenger cars like multiple-unit cars whose traction motors do not yield room on axles to allow the placement of disk brakes) are equipped with clasp brakes which directly grab the rolling surface of the wheels (much like the old horse buggy brakes of yesteryear). Such brakes are an external-shoe drum brake; but unlike band brakes and many internal-shoe drum brakes, there is no self-assist/self-servo effect, and so they are far less susceptible to locking than self-assist brakes. Due to high stiffness and relatively low power, these clasp brakes are even less prone to lockup than many disc brakes, and so freight cars using them are not equipped with anti-lock systems.

The first development of modern ceramic brakes was made by British engineers working in the railway industry for TGV applications in 1988. The objective was to reduce weight, the number of brakes per axle, as well as provide stable friction from very high speeds and all temperatures. The result was a carbon-fibre-reinforced ceramic process that is now used in various forms for automotive, railway, and aircraft brake applications.

== Controlling fade through driving technique ==
Brake fade and rotor warping can be reduced through proper braking technique; when running down a long downgrade that would require braking simply select a lower gear (this is required for many trucks on steep grades in the U.S.). Also, periodic, rather than continuous application of the brakes will allow them to cool between applications. Continuous light application of the brakes can be particularly destructive in both wear and adding heat to the brake system.

== Brake modification to reduce fade ==
High performance brake components provide enhanced stopping power by improving friction while reducing brake fade. Improved friction is provided by lining materials that have a higher coefficient of friction than standard brake pads, while brake fade is reduced through the use of more expensive binding resins with a higher melting point, along with slotted, drilled, or dimpled discs/rotors that reduce the gaseous boundary layer, in addition to providing enhanced heat dissipation. Heat buildup in brakes can be further addressed by body modifications that direct cold air to the brakes.

The "gaseous boundary layer" is a hot rod mechanics explanation for failing self servo effect of drum brakes because it felt like a brick under the brake pedal when it occurred. To counter this effect, brake shoes were drilled and slotted to vent gas. In spite of that, drum brakes were abandoned for their self-servo effect. Disks do not have that because application force is applied at right angles to the resulting braking force. There is no interaction.

Adherents of gas emission have carried that belief to motorcycles, bicycles and "sports" cars, while all other disk brake users from the same automotive companies have no holes through the faces of their discs, although internal radial air passages are used. Vents to release gas have not been found on railway, aircraft and passenger car brakes because there is no gas to vent. Meanwhile, heavy trucks still use drum brakes because they take up the same space. Railways have never used internal expanding drum brakes because they cause skidding, causing expensive flat spots on steel wheels.

Both disc and drum brakes can be improved by any technique that removes heat from the braking surfaces.

Drum brake fade can be reduced and overall performance enhanced by the technique of drum drilling. A pattern of holes is drilled through the drum working section; drum rotation centrifugally pumps air through the shoe to drum gap, removing heat; fade caused by water-wet brakes is reduced since the water is centrifugally driven out; and some brake-material dust exits the holes. Brake drum drilling requires detailed knowledge of brake drum physics and is an advanced technique best left to professionals. There are performance-brake shops that will make the necessary modifications safely.

Brake fade caused by overheating brake fluid (often called pedal fade) can also be reduced through the use of thermal barriers that are placed between the brake pad and the brake caliper piston. These reduce the transfer of heat from the pad to the caliper and in turn hydraulic brake fluid. Some high-performance racing calipers include such brake heat shields made from titanium or ceramic materials. However, it is also possible to purchase aftermarket titanium brake heat shields that will fit an existing brake system to provide protection from brake heat. These inserts are precision cut to cover as much of the pad as possible. Since they are relatively inexpensive and easy to install, they are popular with racers and track day enthusiasts.

Another technique employed to prevent brake fade is the incorporation of cooling shims (Coolshims). Like titanium heat shields, the brake coolers are designed to slide between the brake pad backing plate and the caliper piston. They are constructed from a high thermal conductivity, high yield strength metal composite which conducts the heat from the interface to a heat sink which is external to the caliper and in the airflow. They have been shown to decrease caliper piston temperatures by over twenty percent and to also significantly decrease the time needed to cool.

== See also ==
- Disc brake
- Drum brake
