= Ausco Lambert disc brake =

The Ausco-Lambert disc brake is an unusual brake where an axially-expanding shoe assembly is sandwiched between two linked rotating discs. It may be thought of as an "inside out" disc brake: instead of pads pinching a disc, the pads expand inside a hollow disc.

== History ==
Ausco-Lambert brakes were introduced in late 1948 and used commercially in some Chrysler cars and some Farmall tractors.

The 1950 Crosley Hot Shot is often given credit for the first production disc brakes but the Chrysler Imperial actually had them first as standard equipment at the beginning of the 1949 model year. The Crosley disc was a Goodyear development, a caliper type with ventilated rotor, originally designed for aircraft applications. Only the Hot Shot featured it. Lack of sufficient research caused enormous reliability problems, especially in regions requiring the use of salt on winter roads, such as sticking and corrosion. Drum brake conversion for Hot Shots was quite popular.

The Chrysler 4-wheel disc brake system was more complex and expensive than Crosley's, but far more efficient and reliable. It was built by Auto Specialties Manufacturing Company (Ausco) of St. Joseph, Michigan, under patents of inventor H.L. Lambert, and was first tested on a 1939 Plymouth. Unlike the caliper disc, the Ausco-Lambert utilized twin expanding discs that rubbed against the inner surface of a cast iron brake drum, which doubled as the brake housing. The discs spread apart to create friction against the inner drum surface through the action of standard wheel cylinders.

Chrysler discs were "self energizing," in that some of the braking energy itself contributed to the braking effort. This was accomplished by small balls set into oval holes leading to the brake surface. When the disc made initial contact with the friction surface, the balls would be forced up the holes forcing the discs further apart and augmenting the braking energy. This made for lighter braking pressure than with calipers, avoided brake fade, promoted cooler running and provided one-third more friction surface than standard Chrysler twelve-inch drums. But because of the expense, the brakes were only standard on the Chrysler Crown Imperial through 1954 and the Town and Country Newport in 1950. They were optional, however, on other Chryslers, priced around $400, at a time when an entire Crosley Hot Shot retailed for $935. Today's owners consider the Ausco-Lambert very reliable and powerful, but admit its grabbiness and sensitivity.

== Pad Expansion ==
The Ausco-Lambert brake has an unusual mechanism to expand the brake pads. It uses two flat rings, both with pad material on one side and conical divots on the other side. Two rings are placed together with the conical divots facing together and a ball bearing in each pair of divots. When the rings are rotated relative to each other, the balls roll up the ramp faces of the conical divots, pushing apart the two rings.

== Self Energizing ==
The Ausco-Lambert brake is self-energizing. It holds one ring rigidly and lets the other rotate freely, without a stop. The rotation direction is arranged so the direction of free rotation is the same as the hollow brake "disc". Thus, the disc tends to pull the ring in the direction that further applies the brake. A shallower cone angle increases the amount of self-energizing effect. Self-energizing brakes are more subject to brake fade, but it appears part of the Ausco Lambert design is to reduce the exponential gain of drum and band brakes, and thus reduce grabbiness and hot fade.

== Self Release ==
When the disc rotates the opposite direction of ring rotation, the brake tends to self-release. This is common also for drum brakes and is acceptable for uses where hard braking is in one direction.

== See also ==
- Brake fluid pressure sensor
