= Disc brake =

Mechanism using friction to resist rotation of a circular plate

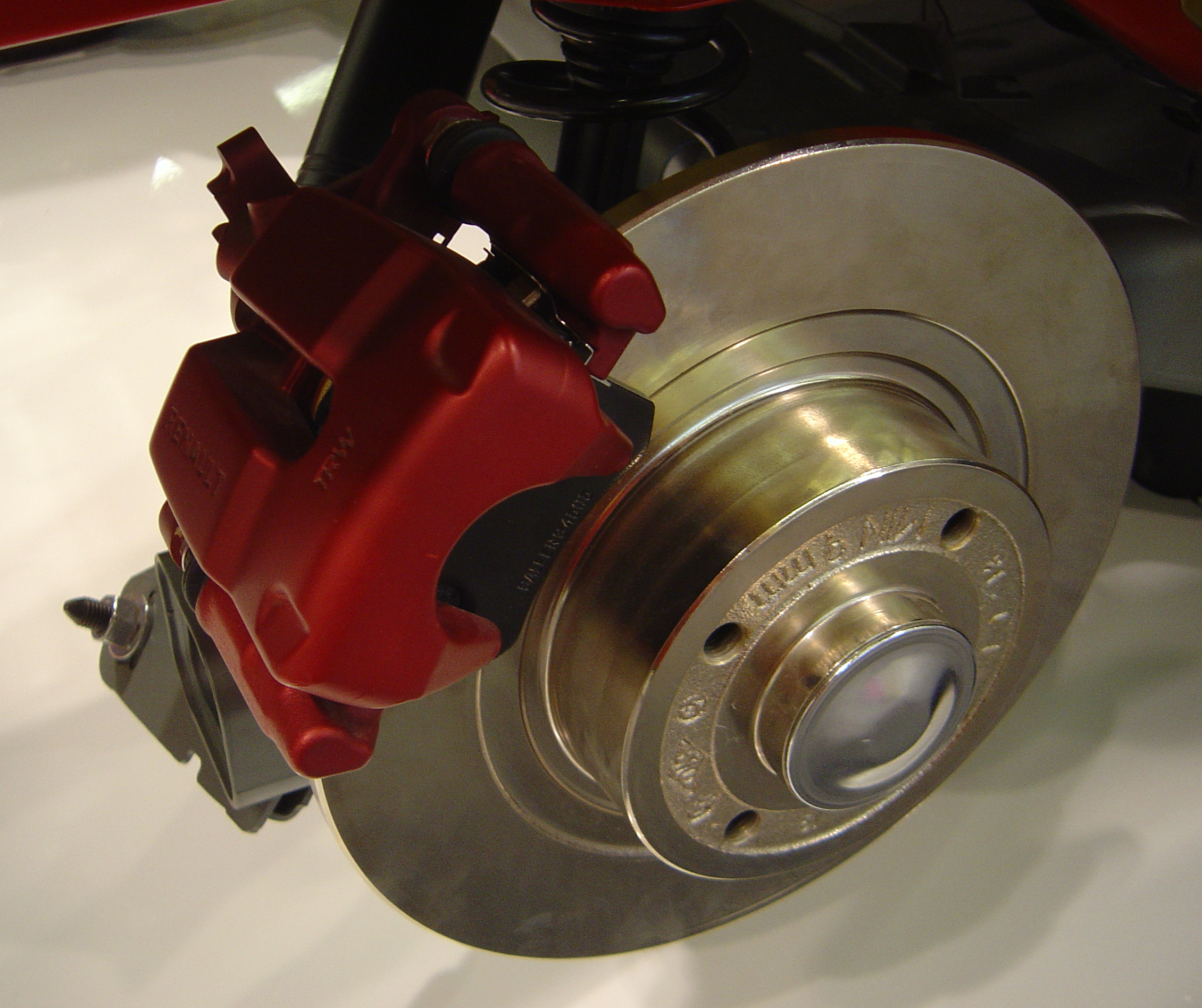
Close-up of a disc brake on a Renault car

Location of a Disc Brake inside the Wheel assembly of the Vehicle.

A disc brake is a type of brake that uses the calipers to squeeze pairs of pads against a disc (sometimes called a [brake] rotor) to create friction. There are two basic types of brake pad friction mechanisms: abrasive friction and adherent friction. This action slows the rotation of a shaft, such as a vehicle axle, either to reduce its rotational speed or to hold it stationary. The energy of motion is converted into heat, which must be dissipated to the environment. Disc brakes are found in most automobiles and are more expensive to manufacture than a drum brake. Disc brakes are also found on some higher-end bicycles.

Hydraulically actuated disc brakes are the most commonly used mechanical braking system for motor vehicles. The principles of a disc brake apply to almost any rotating shaft. The components include the disc, master cylinder, and caliper, which contain at least one cylinder and two brake pads on both sides of the rotating disc.

== Design ==
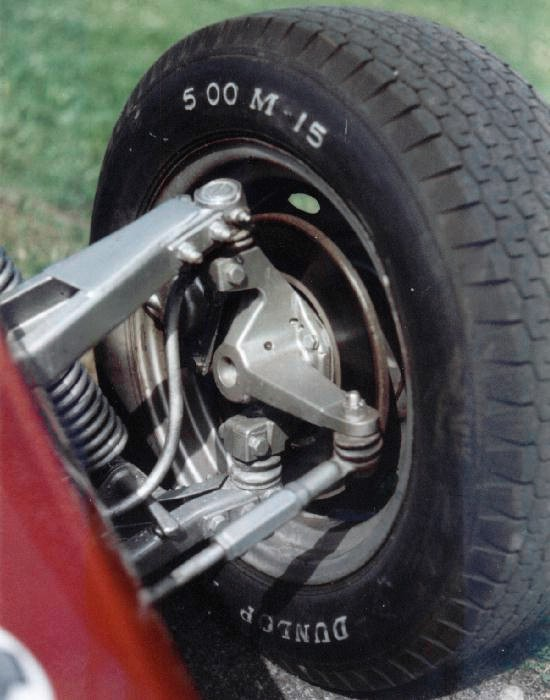
On automobiles, disc brakes are often located within the wheel

Main components of disc brake assembly

The development of disc-type brakes began in England in the 1890s. In 1902, the Lanchester Motor Company designed brakes that looked and operated similarly to a modern disc-brake system, even though the disc was thin and a cable activated the brake pad. Other designs were not practical or widely available in cars for another 60 years. Successful applications began in airplanes before World War II. The first vehicle of any sort to be equipped with disc brakes was the German Tiger tank, which needed a type of disc brake on each of its axles to slow it.

After World War II, technological progress began in 1949, with caliper-type four-wheel disc brakes on the Crosley line and a Chrysler non-caliper type. In the 1950s, there was a demonstration of superiority at the 1953 24 Hours of Le Mans race, which required braking from high speeds several times per lap. The Jaguar racing team won, using disc brake-equipped cars, with much of the credit being given to the brakes' superior performance over rivals equipped with drum brakes. Mass production began with the 1949–1950 inclusion in all Crosley production, with sustained mass production starting in 1955 Citroën DS.

Disc brakes provide better stopping performance than drum brakes because they cool more effectively, reducing heat-related brake fade and recovering faster after immersion. Consequently, discs are less prone to the brake fade caused when brake components overheat. Unlike drum brakes, which often exhibit a self-servo effect from the leading shoes, disc brakes have no self-servo action, so braking force is proportional to applied pressure. This improves driver "feel" and helps prevent wheel lockup. Disc brakes also recover more quickly from immersion (wet brakes are less effective than dry ones). Drums are also prone to "bell mouthing" and trap worn lining material within the assembly, causing various braking problems. Although seldom encountered, the drum should be reconditioned if there is any bell-mouthing.

The disc is usually made of cast iron. In some cases, it may be made of composites, such as reinforced carbon–carbon or ceramic matrix composites. This is connected to the wheel and the axle. To slow down the wheel, friction material in the form of brake pads, mounted on the brake caliper, is forced mechanically, hydraulically, pneumatically, or electromagnetically against both sides of the disc. Friction causes the disc and attached wheel to slow or stop.

== Operation ==
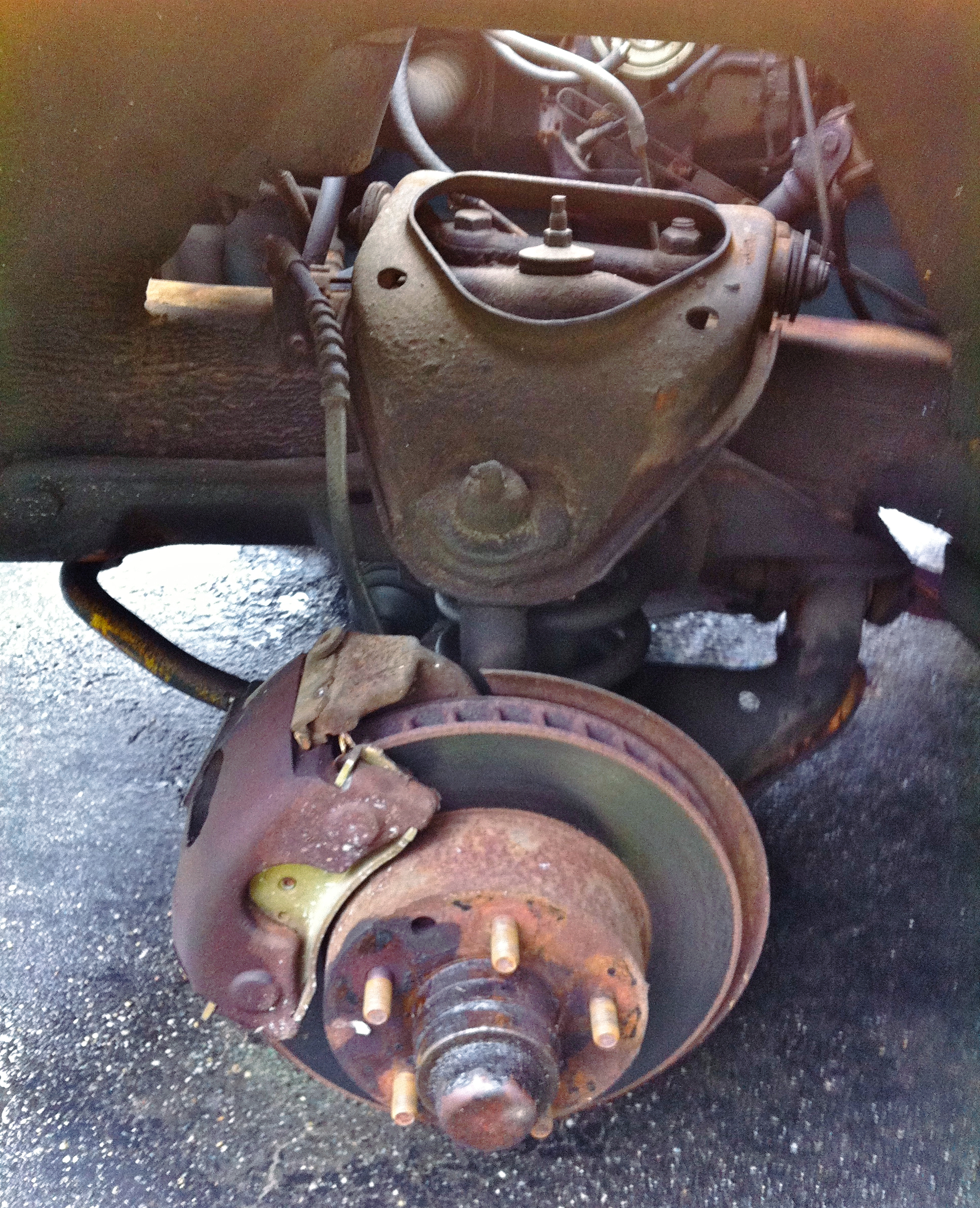
Front suspension and brake system on AMC Pacer with the rectangular open slots visible between the disc's friction surfaces

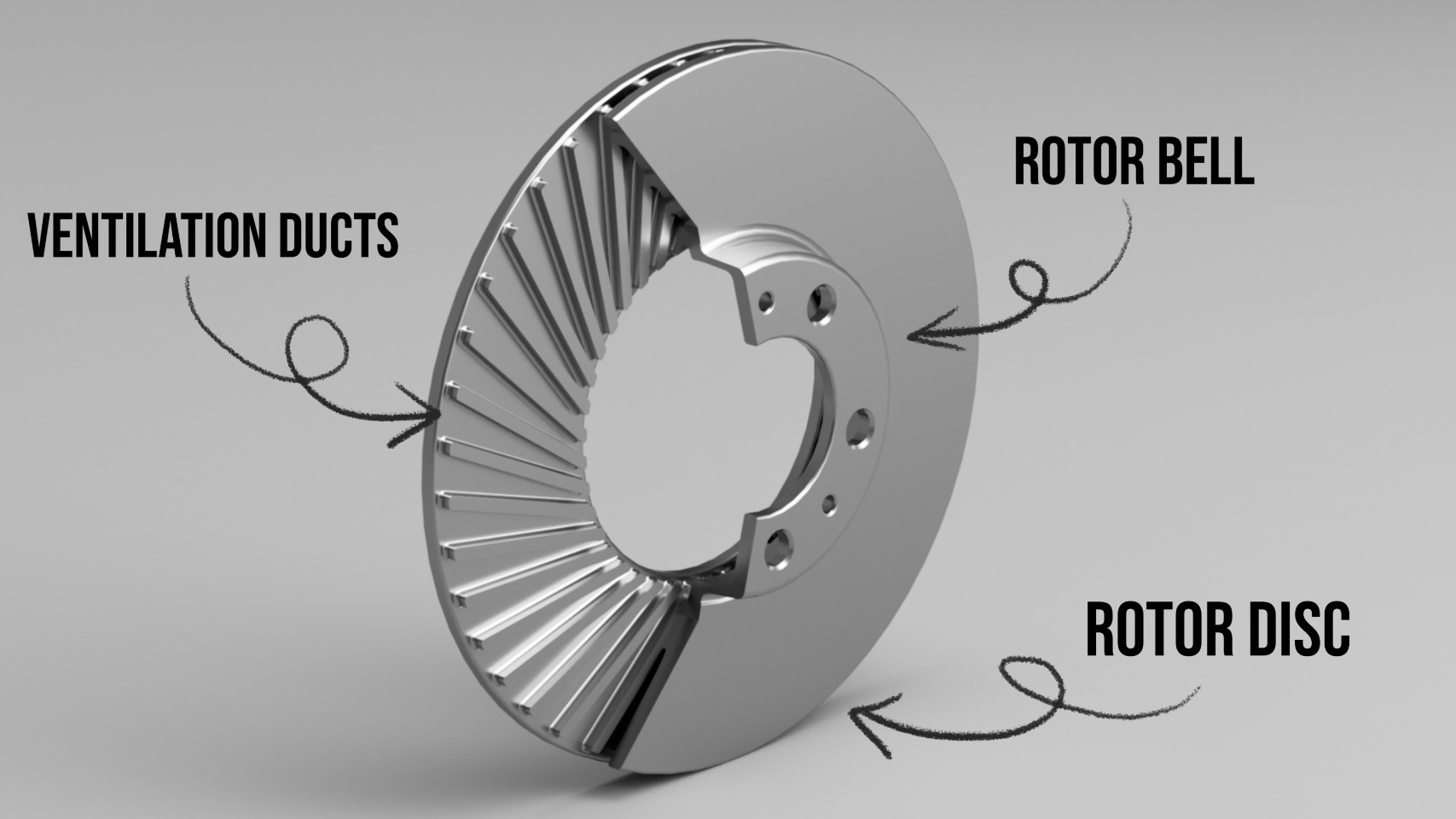
Basic construction of ventilated rotor

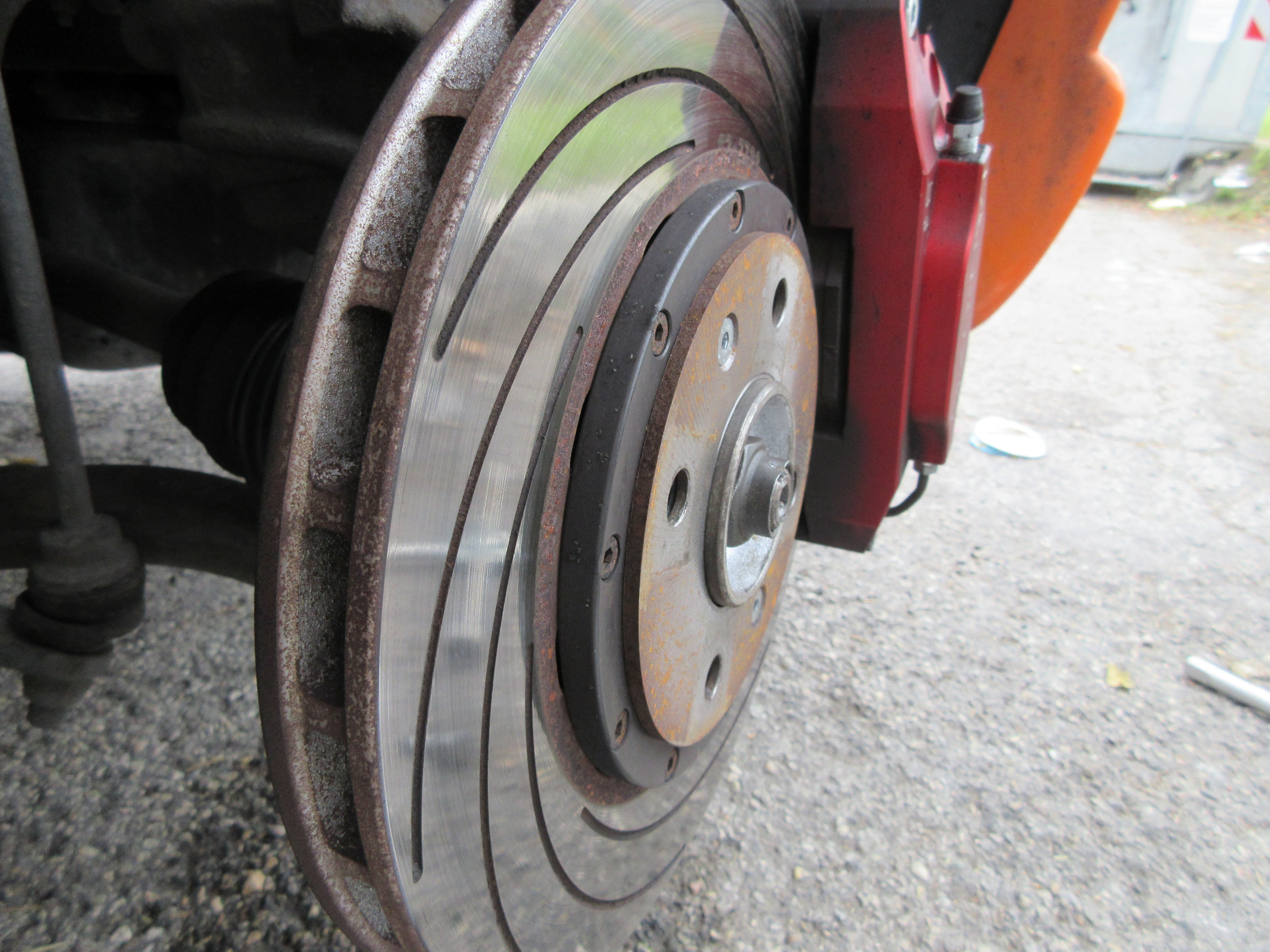
Example of two piece disc in an aftermarket application to a Peugeot 106

The brake disc is the rotating part of a wheel's disc brake assembly, against which the brake pads are applied. The material is typically gray iron, a form of cast iron. The design of the discs varies. Some are solid, but others are hollowed out, with fins or vanes joining the disc's two contact surfaces (usually included during casting). The weight and power of the vehicle determine the need for ventilated discs. The "ventilated" disc design helps to dissipate the generated heat and is commonly used on the more heavily loaded front discs.

Discs for motorcycles, bicycles, and some cars often have holes or slots cut through them. This is done for better heat dissipation, to aid surface-water dispersal, to reduce noise, to reduce mass, or purely for non-functional aesthetics.

Slotted discs have shallow channels machined into the disc to aid in removing dust and gas. Slotting is preferred in most racing environments to remove gas and water and deglaze brake pads. Some discs are both drilled and slotted. Slotted discs are generally not used on standard vehicles because they quickly wear down brake pads; however, removing material is beneficial for race vehicles, as it keeps the pads soft and prevents their surfaces from vitrifying. On the road, drilled or slotted discs still have a positive effect in wet conditions because the holes or slots prevent a water film from forming between the disc and the pads.

Two-piece discs consist of a central section combined with a separately manufactured outer friction ring. The central section is often called a bell or hat because of its shape. It is commonly manufactured from an alloy such as 7075 alloy and hard anodised for a lasting finish. The outer disc ring is usually made of grey iron. They can also be made of steel or carbon ceramic for particular applications. These materials originated from motorsport use and are available in high-performance vehicles and aftermarket upgrades. Two-piece discs can be supplied as a fixed assembly with nuts, bolts, and washers, or as a more complex floating system in which drive bobbins allow the two parts of the brake disc to expand and contract at different rates, thereby reducing the risk of disc warping from overheating. Advantages of a two-piece disc are a reduction of critical unsprung mass and the dissipation of heat from the disc surface through the alloy bell (hat). Both fixed and floating options have their drawbacks and advantages. Floating discs are prone to rattle, the collection of debris, and are best suited to motorsport, whereas fixed discs are best for road use.

Types of brake disc designs
Image	Name	Description
Non-ventilated (solid) brake rotor model	Non-ventilated (solid) smooth brake disc	The most basic form of brake rotors uses a solid disc, primarily at the rear wheels of a vehicle, as rear brakes are not subjected to braking forces as high as those at the front due to the vehicle's weight transfer to the front during braking (vehicle dip).
Ventilated plain (smooth) brake rotor model	Ventilated smooth brake disc	This brake rotor is primarily used at the front of the vehicle and features ventilation ducts in the disc design, helping the disc cool faster during and after braking and preventing brake fade.
Ventilated straight slotted brake rotor model	Ventilated straight slotted brake disc)	A modified form of ventilated smooth brake rotors. The slots collect and discharge brake dust or debris during and after braking.
Ventilated curve slotted brake rotor model	Ventilated curve slotted brake disc	The purpose of the curved slots is to increase the length of each, maximizing the collection of brake dust and debris. The curved design facilitates faster discharge of brake dust and debris as the rotor rotates.
Ventilated staright drilled brake rotor model	Ventilated straight drilled brake disc	The drilled design prevents a vacuum from forming between the brake pads and rotor when the braking system comes into contact with water. The drilled holes in the disc facilitate water egress from the contact surface between the brake pads and the brake disc.
Ventilated curve drilled brake rotor model	Ventilated curve drilled brake disc	A modification of the straight-drilled rotor design. The purpose is to increase the number of holes per thread and ensure that at least one hole is in contact with the brake pad at any position of the brake pad.
Ventilated straight drilled & slotted brake rotor model	Ventilated straight drilled & slotted brake disc	This design combines a straight slotted and a straight drilled design to provide collection and discharge of brake dust and debris, while preventing vacuum from being generated at the contact surface between the brake pads and the brake rotor disc.
Ventilated curve drilled & slotted brake rotor model	Ventilated curved drilled & slotted brake disc	A modified form of straight drilled & slotted rotors, to maximize the collection and discharge of brake dust and debris, along with the prevention of vacuum being generated between brake pads and rotor disc. These are primarily for performance and race cars.
Ventilated dragon scaled (custom designed) brake rotor model	Ventilated dragon scale slotted brake disc	A custom slot design may include variants such as V Slots, U slots, J hooks, etc. The names of each design may vary by manufacturer, and the slot design depends on brake performance requirements.
Ventilated 2-piece floating disc curve drilled & slotted brake rotor model	Ventilated floating 2-piece brake disc	The brake rotor is assembled into two parts: the rotor bell (carrier) - shown in black - connecting the brake rotor to the wheel hub, and the disc (rotor blade) - which contacts the brake pads and performs the braking function. These types of brake rotors are used in motorsports and racing to accommodate thermal expansion at high braking temperatures, increasing the reliability and performance of the braking system.

== History ==
=== Early experiments ===
Disc brake development began in England in the 1890s. The first caliper-type automobile disc brake was patented by Frederick William Lanchester in his Birmingham factory in 1902 and used successfully on Lanchester cars. However, the limited choice of metals at the time meant he used copper as the braking medium acting on the disc. The poor state of the roads at this time, no more than dusty, rough tracks, meant that the copper wore quickly, making the system impractical.

In 1921, the Douglas motorcycle company introduced a form of disc brake on the front wheel of their overhead-valve sports models. Patented by the British Motorcycle & Cycle-Car Research Association, the device was described by Douglas as a "novel wedge brake" operating on a "beveled hub flange". A Bowden cable operated the brake. Front and rear brakes of this type were fitted to the machine on which Tom Sheard rode to victory in the 1923 Senior TT.

Successful application began on railroad streamliner passenger trains, airplanes, and tanks before and during World War II. In the United States, the Budd Company introduced disc brakes on the General Pershing Zephyr for the Burlington Railroad in 1938. By the early 1950s, disc brakes were regularly applied to new passenger rolling stock. In Britain, the Daimler Company used disc brakes on its Daimler Armoured Car of 1939. The disc brakes, made by the Girling company, were necessary because in that four-wheel drive (4×4) vehicle, the epicyclic final drive was in the wheel hubs and therefore left no room for conventional hub-mounted drum brakes.

At Germany's Argus Motoren, Hermann Klaue (1912-2001) patented disc brakes in 1940. Argus supplied wheels fitted with disc brakes, e.g., for the Arado Ar 96. The German Tiger I heavy tank was introduced in 1942 with a 55 cm (22 in) Argus-Werke disc on each drive shaft. They served as the main braking system operated by foot pedal controls as well as an emergency steering system.

The American Crosley "Hot Shot" had four-wheel disc brakes in 1949 and 1950. However, these quickly proved troublesome and were removed. Crosley returned to drum brakes and conversions to drums for Hot Shots were popular. Lack of sufficient research caused reliability problems, such as sticking and corrosion, especially in regions using salt on winter roads. Crosley four-wheel disc brakes made the cars, and Crosley-based specials, popular in SCCA H-Production and H-modified racing in the 1950s. The Crosley disc was a Goodyear-Hawley design, a modern caliper "spot" type with a modern disc, derived from a design from aircraft applications.

Chrysler developed a unique braking system, offered from 1949 until 1953. Instead of the disc with caliper squeezing on it, this system used twin expanding discs that rubbed against the inner surface of a cast-iron brake drum, which doubled as the brake housing. The discs spread apart to create friction against the inner drum surface through the action of standard wheel cylinders. Because of the expense, the brakes were only standard on the Chrysler Crown and the Town and Country Newport in 1950. They were optional, however, on other Chryslers, priced around $400, at a time when an entire Crosley Hot Shot retailed for $935. This four-wheel disc brake system was built by Auto Specialties Manufacturing Company (Ausco) of St. Joseph, Michigan, under patents of inventor H.L. Lambert, and was first tested on a 1939 Plymouth. Chrysler discs were "self-energizing," in that some of the braking energy itself contributed to the braking effort. This was accomplished by small balls set into oval holes leading to the braking surface. When the disc made initial contact with the friction surface, the balls would be forced up the holes forcing the discs further apart and augmenting the braking energy. This made for lighter braking pressure than with calipers, avoided brake fade, promoted cooler running, and provided one-third more friction surface than standard Chrysler 12-inch (305 mm) drums. The Ausco-Lambert is considered reliable and powerful, but exhibits "grabbiness and sensitivity".

In 1953, fifty aluminum-bodied Austin-Healey 100S (Sebring) models, built primarily for racing, were the first European cars sold to the public to have disc brakes, fitted to all four wheels.

=== First impact in racing ===
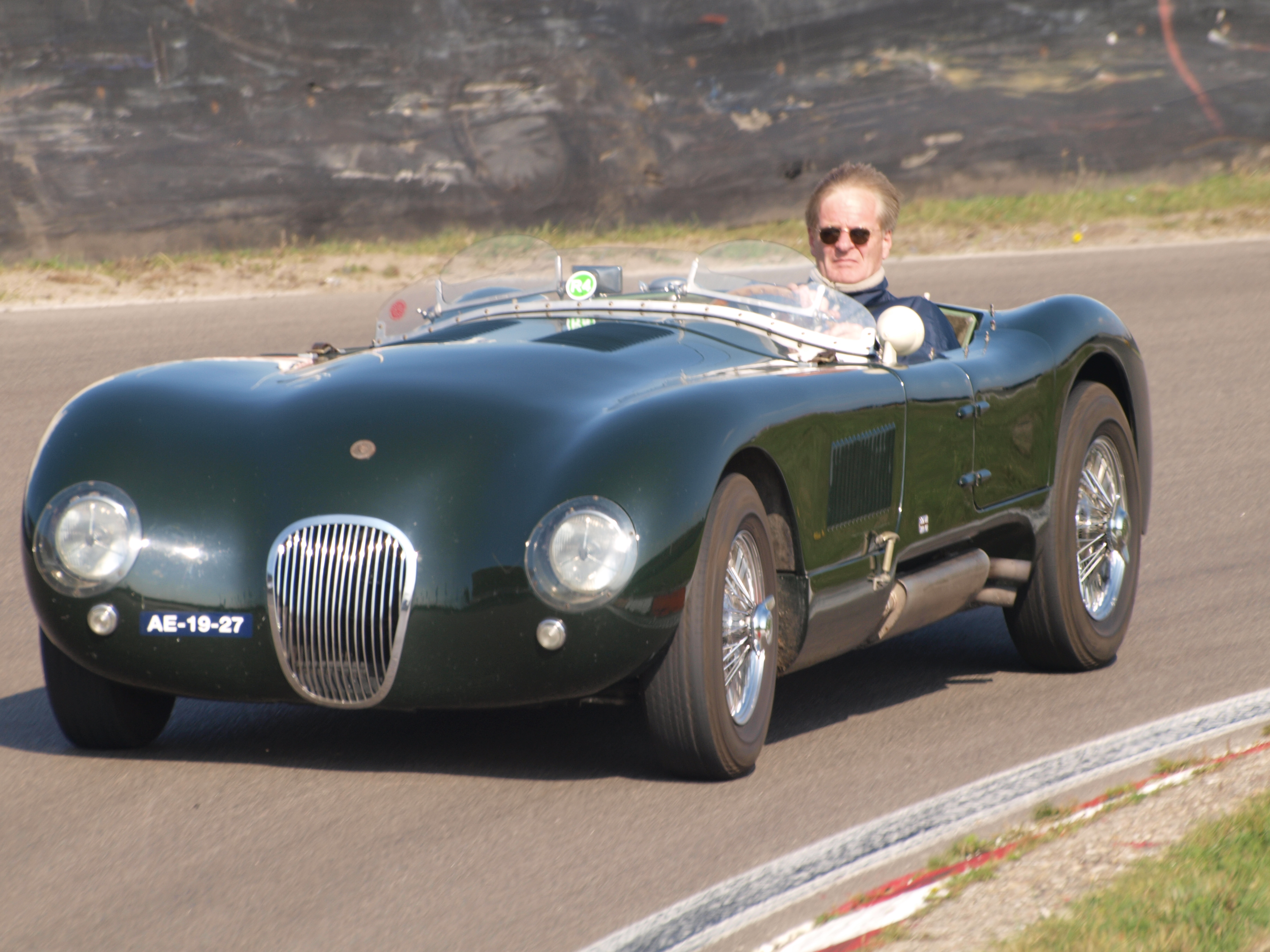
Jaguar C TYPE similar to the 1953 "24 Heures du Mans" winner

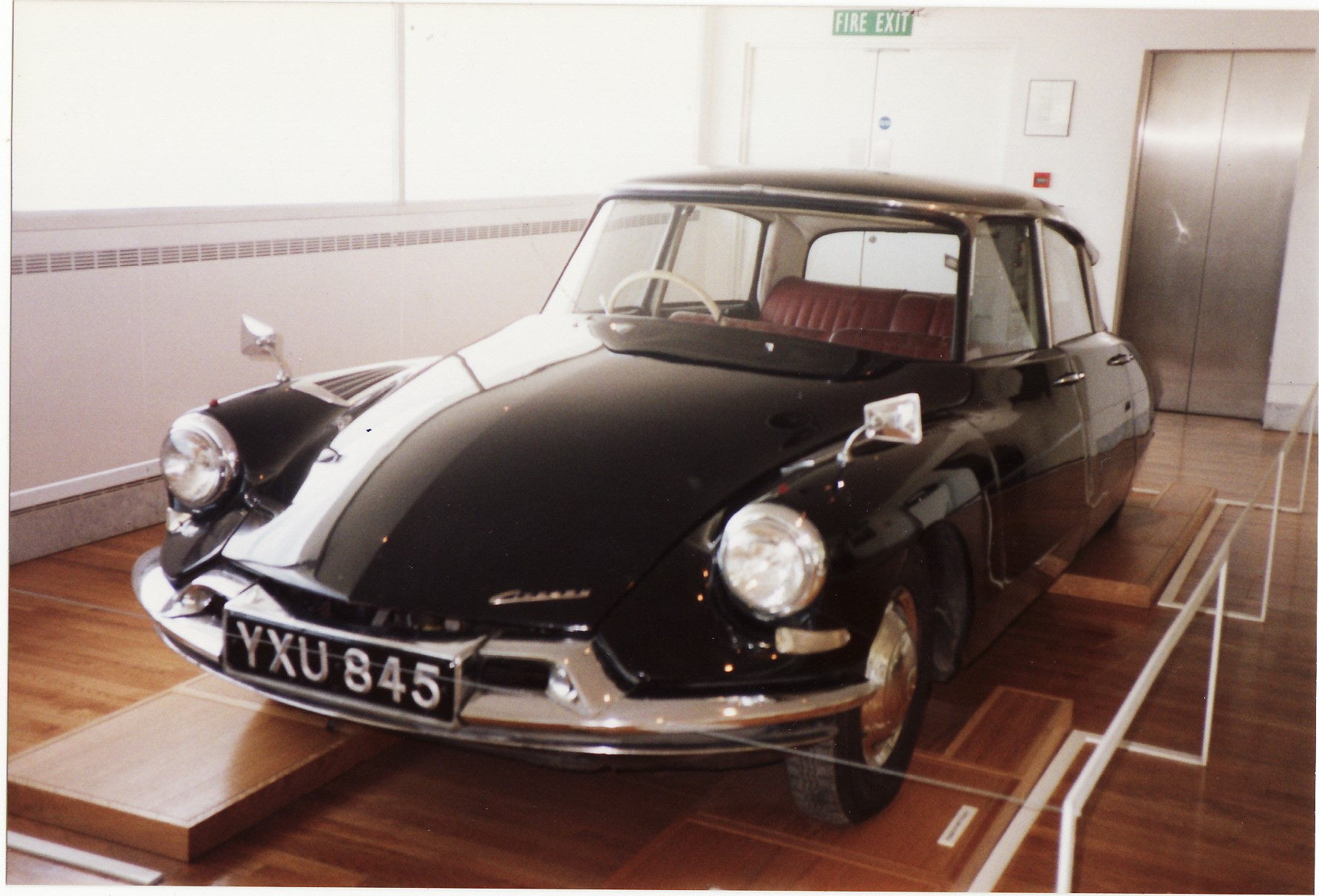
Citroën DS 19

The Jaguar C-Type racing car won the 1953 24 Hours of Le Mans, the only vehicle in the race to use disc brakes, developed in the UK by Dunlop, and the first car at Le Mans ever to average over 100 mph (161 km/h). "Rivals' large drum brakes could match discs' ultimate stopping, but not their formidable staying power."

Before this, in 1950, a Crosley HotShot with stock four-wheel disc brakes won the Index of Performance in the first race at Sebring (six hours rather than 12) on New Year's Eve.

=== Mass production ===
The Citroën DS was the first sustained mass production use of modern automotive disc brakes, in 1955. The car featured caliper-type front disc brakes among its many innovations. These discs were mounted inboard near the transmission and were powered by the vehicle's central hydraulic system. This model went on to sell 1.5 million units over 20 years with the same brake setup.

Despite early experiments in 1902, from British Lanchester Motor Company, and in 1949 from Chrysler and Crosley in the United States, the costly and trouble-prone technology was not ready for mass production. Attempts to incorporate the system in large-volume built cars were soon withdrawn.

The Jensen 541, with four-wheel disc brakes, followed in 1956. Triumph exhibited a 1956 TR3 with disc brakes to the public. However, the first production cars with Girling front-disc brakes were made in September 1956. Jaguar began to offer disc brakes in February 1957 on the XK150 model, soon to follow with the Mark 1 sports saloon and in 1959 with the Mark IX large saloon. The MG_MGA#Twin-Cam Twin Cam and Deluxe models featured four-wheel Dunlop disc brakes.

Disc brakes were installed on sports cars when they were first introduced, since these vehicles are more demanding about brake performance. Discs have now become the more common form in most passenger vehicles. However, many (lightweight vehicles) use drum brakes on the rear wheels to keep costs and weight down, as well as to simplify the provisions for a parking brake. This can be a reasonable compromise because the front brakes handle most of the braking.

Many early automobile implementations placed the brakes on the inboard side of the driveshaft, near the differential, whereas most brakes today are located inside the wheels. An inboard location reduces the unsprung mass and eliminates a source of heat transfer to the tires.

Historically, brake discs were manufactured worldwide with a concentration in Europe and America. Between 1989 and 2005, the manufacturing of brake discs migrated predominantly to China.

=== In the United States ===
In 1963, the Studebaker Avanti was factory-equipped with front disc brakes as standard equipment. This Bendix system licensed from Dunlop was also optional on some of the other Studebaker models. Front disc brakes became standard equipment on the 1965 Rambler Marlin. Its tandem master cylinder dual-circuit braking system with power assist included Bendix "E" Series 11.19-inch (284 mm) front discs with four-piston calipers and Bendix 10 in (254 mm) non-servo drums on the rear axle. These features were advanced compared to the all-drum systems with marginal swept area offered by other domestic automakers. This Bendix system was optional on all American Motors' Rambler Classic and Ambassador models, as well as on the Ford Thunderbird and the Lincoln Continental. A four-wheel disc brake system was also introduced in 1965 on the Chevrolet Corvette Stingray. Most domestic-built cars switched from front drum brakes to front disc brakes in the late 1970s and early 1980s.

=== Motorcycles and scooters ===
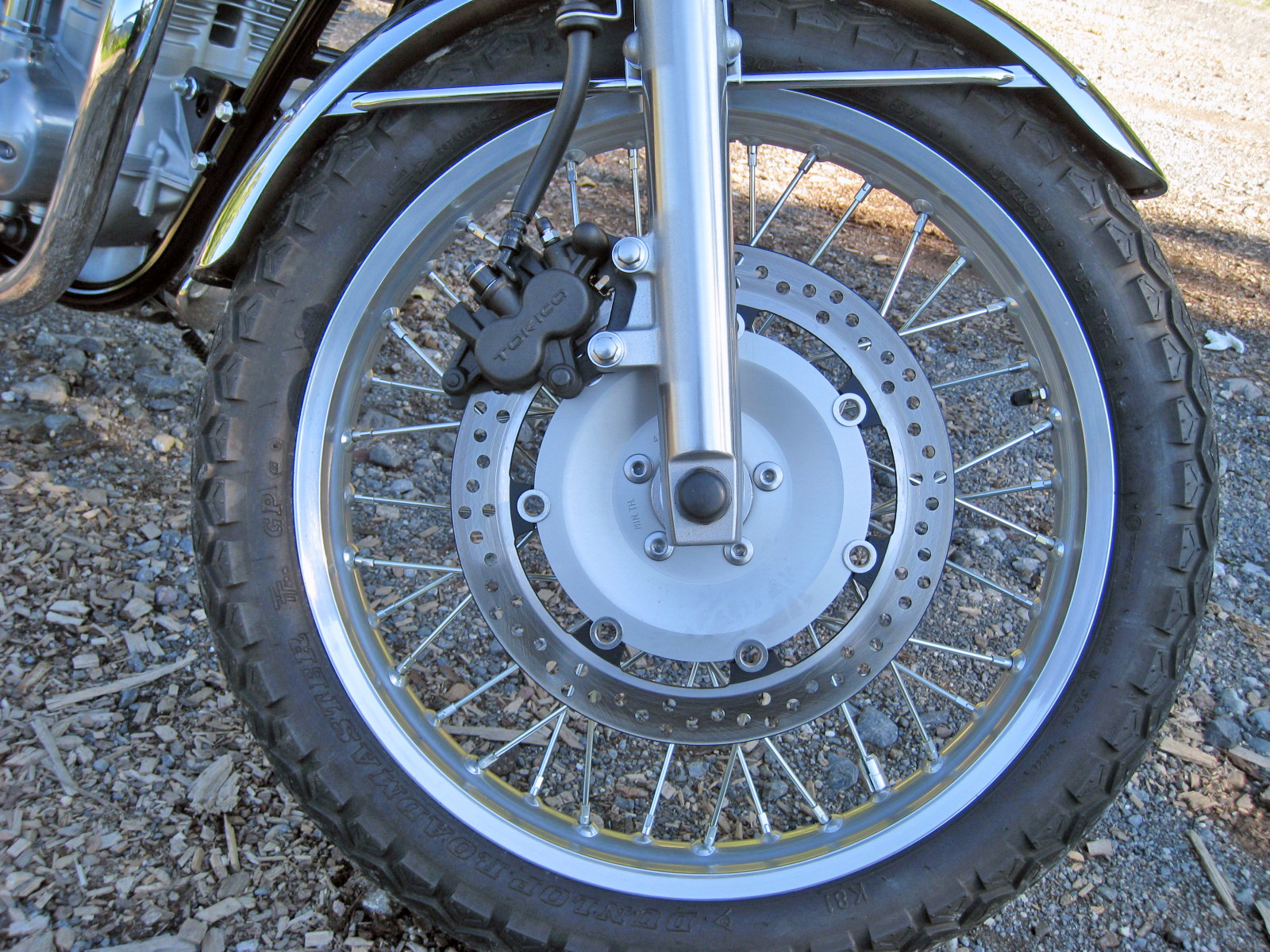
Floating disc brake on Kawasaki W800

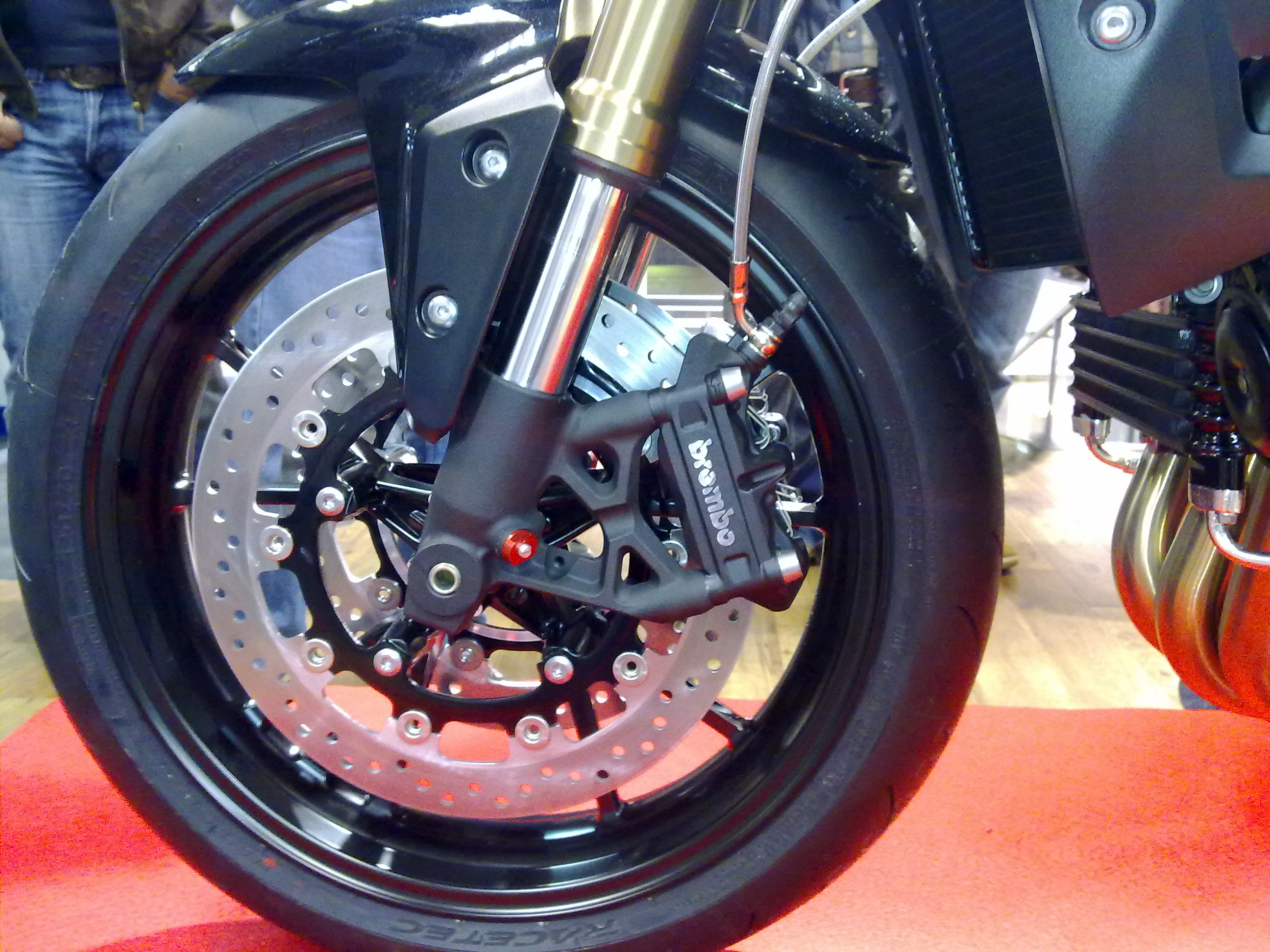
Radially-mounted brake caliper on a Triumph Speed Triple

Lambretta introduced the first high-volume production use of a single, floating, front disc brake, enclosed in a ventilated cast alloy hub and actuated by cable, on the 1962 TV175. This was followed by the GT200 in 1964.

MV Agusta was the second manufacturer to offer a front disc brake motorcycle to the public on a small scale in 1965, on their expensive 600 touring motorcycle featuring cable-operated mechanical actuation. In 1969, Honda introduced the more affordable CB750, which had a single hydraulically actuated front disc brake (and a rear drum brake), and which sold in huge numbers.

Unlike cars, disc brakes that are located within the wheel, bike disc brakes are in the airstream and have optimum cooling. Although cast iron discs have a porous surface that provides superior braking performance, such discs rust in the rain and become unsightly. Accordingly, motorcycle discs are usually stainless steel, drilled, slotted, or wavy to disperse rainwater. Modern motorcycle discs tend to have a floating design whereby the disc "floats" on bobbins and can move slightly, allowing better disc centering with a fixed caliper. A floating disc also avoids disc warping and reduces heat transfer to the wheel hub.

Calipers have evolved from simple single-piston units to two-, four- and even six-piston items. Compared to cars, motorcycles have a higher center of mass:wheelbase ratio, so they experience more weight transfer when braking. Front brakes absorb most of the braking forces, while the rear brake serves mainly to balance the motorcycle during braking. Modern sports motorcycles typically have twin large front discs, with a much smaller single rear disc. Motorcycles that are particularly fast or heavy may have vented discs.

Early disc brakes (such as on the early Honda Fours and the Norton Commando) sited the calipers on top of the disc, ahead of the fork slider. Although this gave the brake pads better cooling, it is now almost universal practice to site the caliper behind the slider (to reduce the angular momentum of the fork assembly). Rear disc calipers may be mounted above (e.g. BMW R1100S) or below (e.g. Yamaha TRX850) the swinging arm: a low mount provides for a marginally lower center of gravity, while an upper siting keeps the caliper cleaner and better-protected from road obstacles.

One problem with motorcycle disc brakes is that when a motorcycle gets into a violent tank-slapper (high-speed oscillation of the front wheel) the brake pads in the calipers are forced away from the discs, so when the rider applies the brake lever, the caliper pistons push the pads towards the discs without actually making contact. The rider then brakes harder, forcing the pads onto the disc much more aggressively than standard braking. An example of this was the Michele Pirro incident at Mugello, Italy 1 June 2018. At least one manufacturer has developed a system to counter the pads being forced away.

A modern development, particularly on inverted ("upside down", or "USD") forks is the radially mounted caliper. Although these are fashionable, there is no evidence that they improve braking performance or add to the fork's stiffness. (Lacking the option of a fork brace, USD forks may be best stiffened by an oversized front axle).

=== Bicycles ===
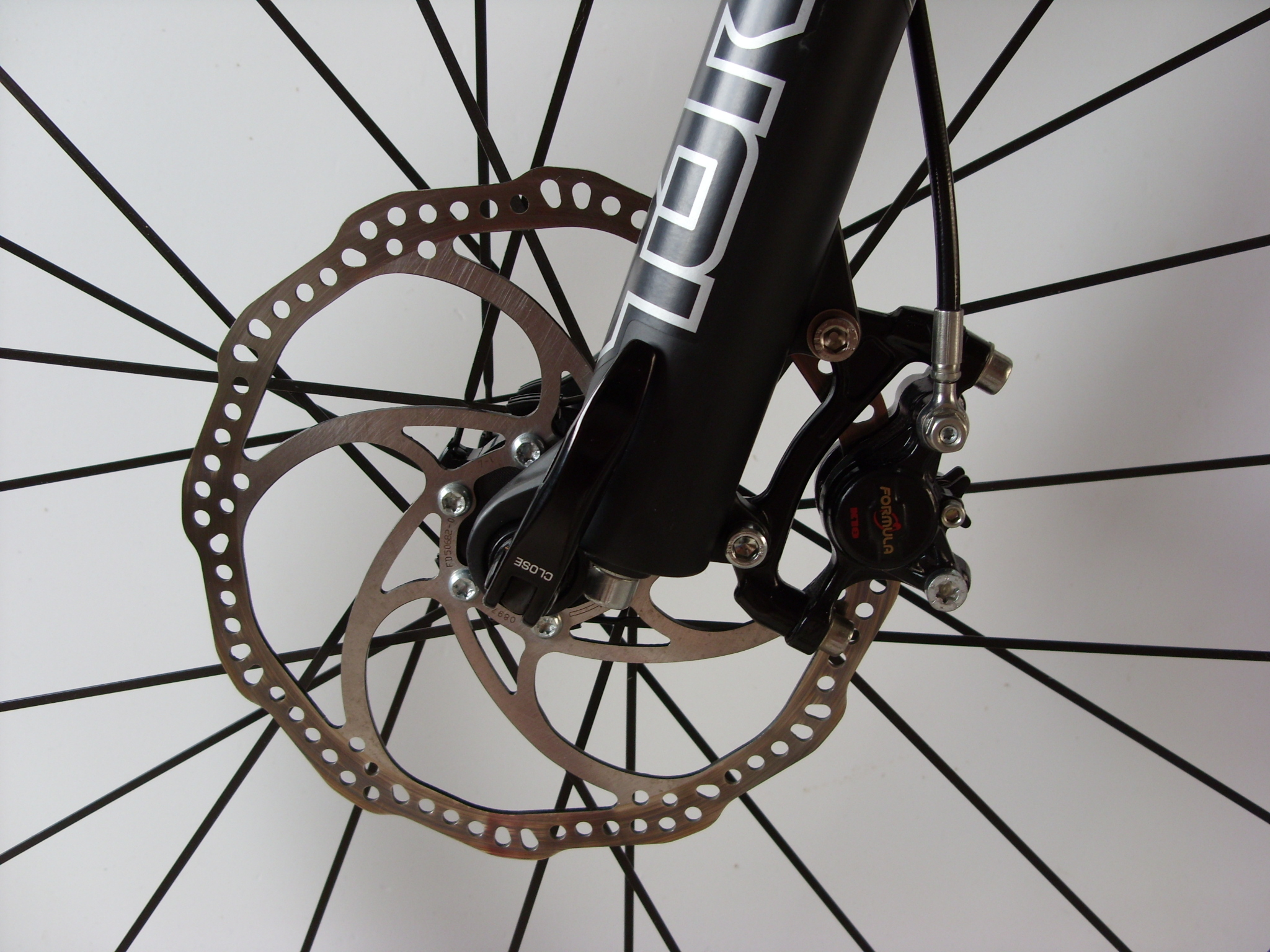
Mountain bike front disc brake

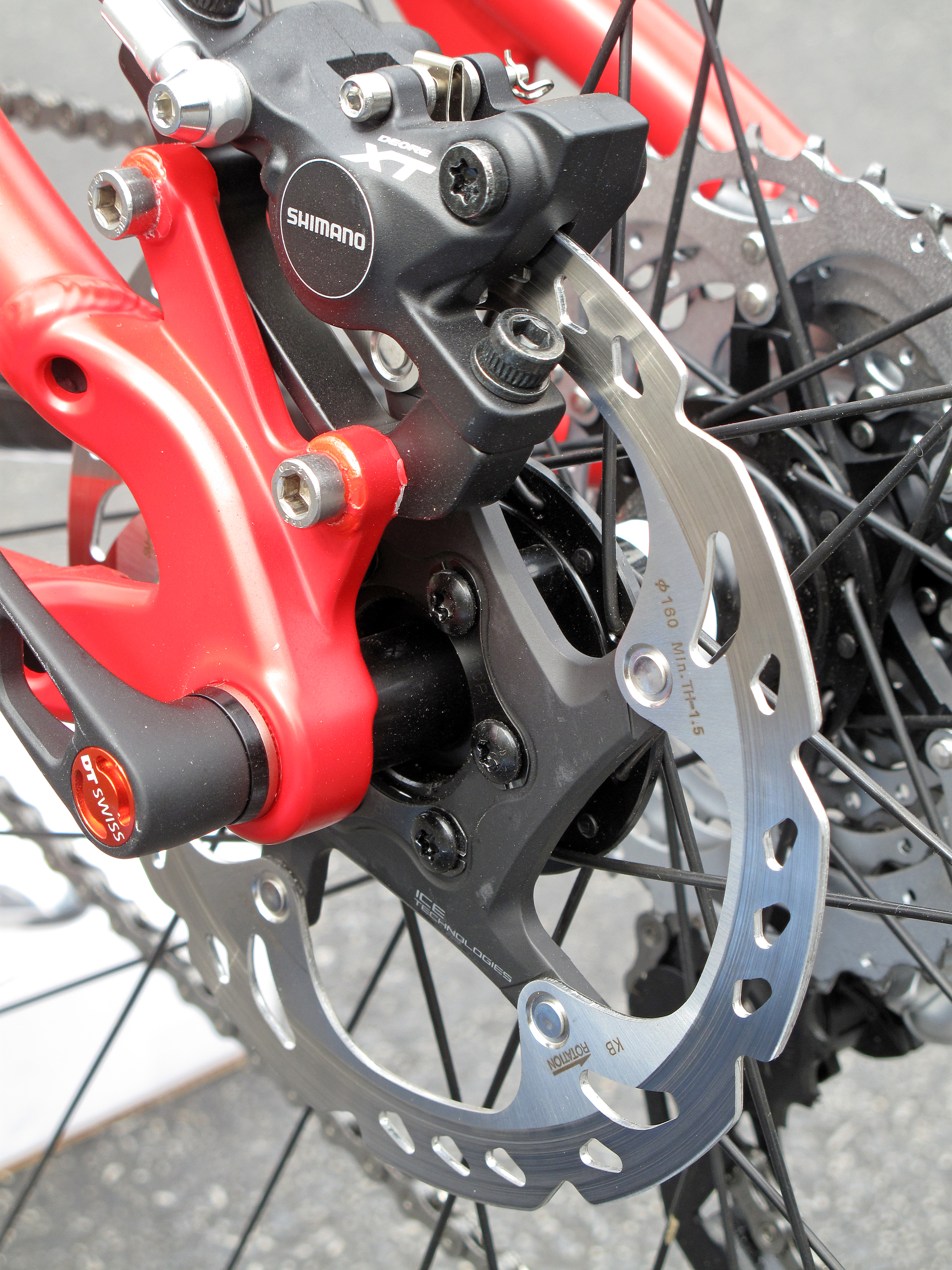
Rear disc brake caliper and disc on a mountain bike

Bike disc brakes may range from simple, mechanical (cable) systems, to expensive and powerful, multi-piston hydraulic disc systems, commonly used on downhill racing bikes. Improved technology has seen the creation of vented discs for use on mountain bikes, similar to those on cars, introduced to help avoid heat fade on fast alpine descents. Discs are also used on road bicycles for all-weather cycling with predictable braking. By 2024, almost all road bikes are equipped with disc brakes, just like mountain bikes. Drums are sometimes preferred as harder to damage in crowded parking, where discs are sometimes bent. Most bicycle brake discs are made of steel. Stainless steel is preferred due to its anti-rust properties. Discs are thin, often about 2 mm. Some use a two-piece floating disc style, others use a one-piece solid metal disc. Bicycle disc brakes use either a two-piston caliper that clamps the disc from both sides or a single-piston caliper with one moving pad that contacts the disc first, and then pushes the disc against the non-moving pad. Because energy efficiency is so important in bicycles, an uncommon feature of bicycle brakes is that the pads retract to eliminate residual drag when the brake is released. In contrast, most other brakes drag the pads lightly when released to minimize initial operational travel.

=== Heavy vehicles ===
Disc brakes are increasingly used on very large and heavy road vehicles, where previously large drum brakes were nearly universal. One reason is that the disc's lack of self-assist makes brake force much more predictable, so peak brake force can be raised without more risk of braking-induced steering or jackknifing on articulated vehicles. Another is disc brakes fade less when hot, and in a heavy vehicle air and rolling drag and engine braking are small parts of total braking force, so brakes are used harder than on lighter vehicles, and drum brake fade can occur in a single stop. For these reasons, a heavy truck with disc brakes can stop in about 120% of the distance of a passenger car, but with drums, stopping takes about 150% of the distance. In Europe, stopping distance regulations essentially require disc brakes for heavy vehicles. In the U.S., drums are allowed and are typically preferred for their lower purchase price, despite higher total lifetime cost and more frequent service intervals.

=== Rail and aircraft ===
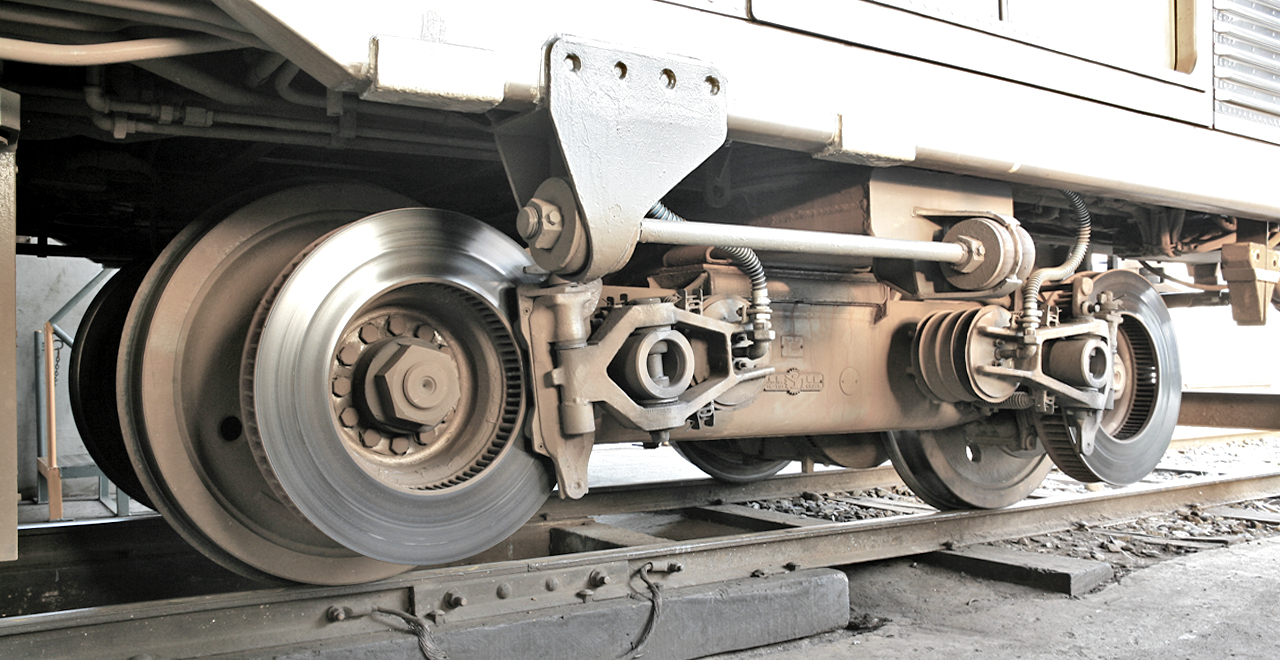
A railroad bogie and disc brakes

Still-larger discs are used for railroad cars, trams, and some airplanes. Passenger rail cars and light rail vehicles often use disc brakes outboard of the wheels, which helps ensure a free flow of cooling air. Some modern passenger rail cars, such as the Amfleet II cars, use inboard disc brakes. This reduces wear from debris and provides protection from rain and snow, which would make the discs slippery and unreliable. However, there is still plenty of cooling for reliable operation. Some airplanes have the brake mounted with very little cooling, and the brake gets hot when stopping. This is acceptable as there is sufficient time for cooling, where the maximum braking energy is very predictable. Should the braking energy exceed the maximum, for example during an emergency occurring during take-off, aircraft wheels can be fitted with a fusible plug to prevent the tire bursting. This is a milestone test in aircraft development.

=== Automotive use ===
For automotive use, disc brake discs are commonly made of grey iron. The SAE maintains a specification for the manufacture of grey iron for various applications. For normal car and light-truck applications, SAE specification J431 G3000 (superseded to G10) dictates the correct range of hardness, chemical composition, tensile strength, and other properties necessary for the intended use. Some racing cars and airplanes use brakes with carbon fiber discs and carbon fiber pads to reduce weight. Wear rates tend to be high, and braking may be poor or grabby until the brake is hot.

=== Racing ===
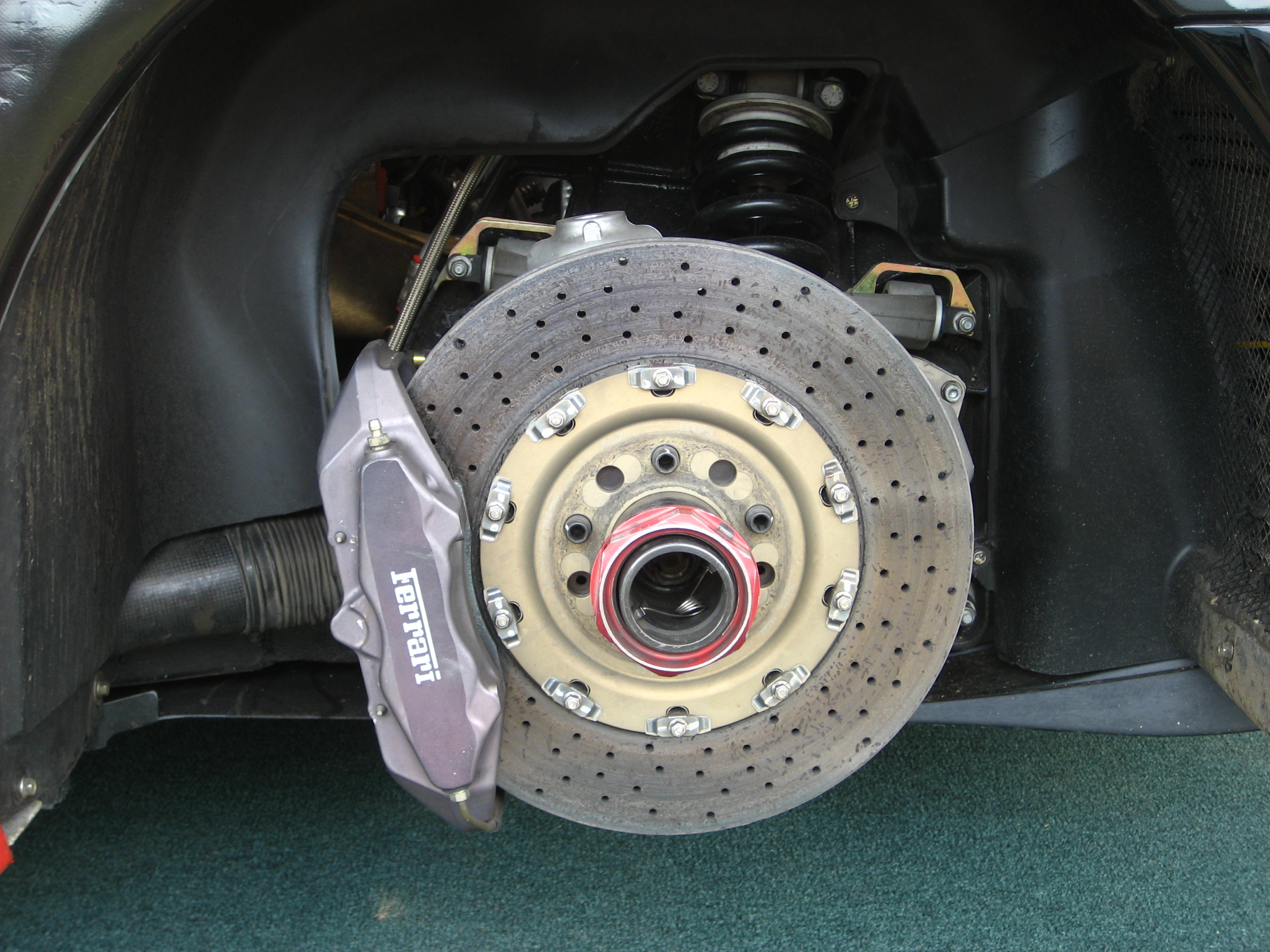
Reinforced carbon brake disc on a Ferrari F430 Challenge race car

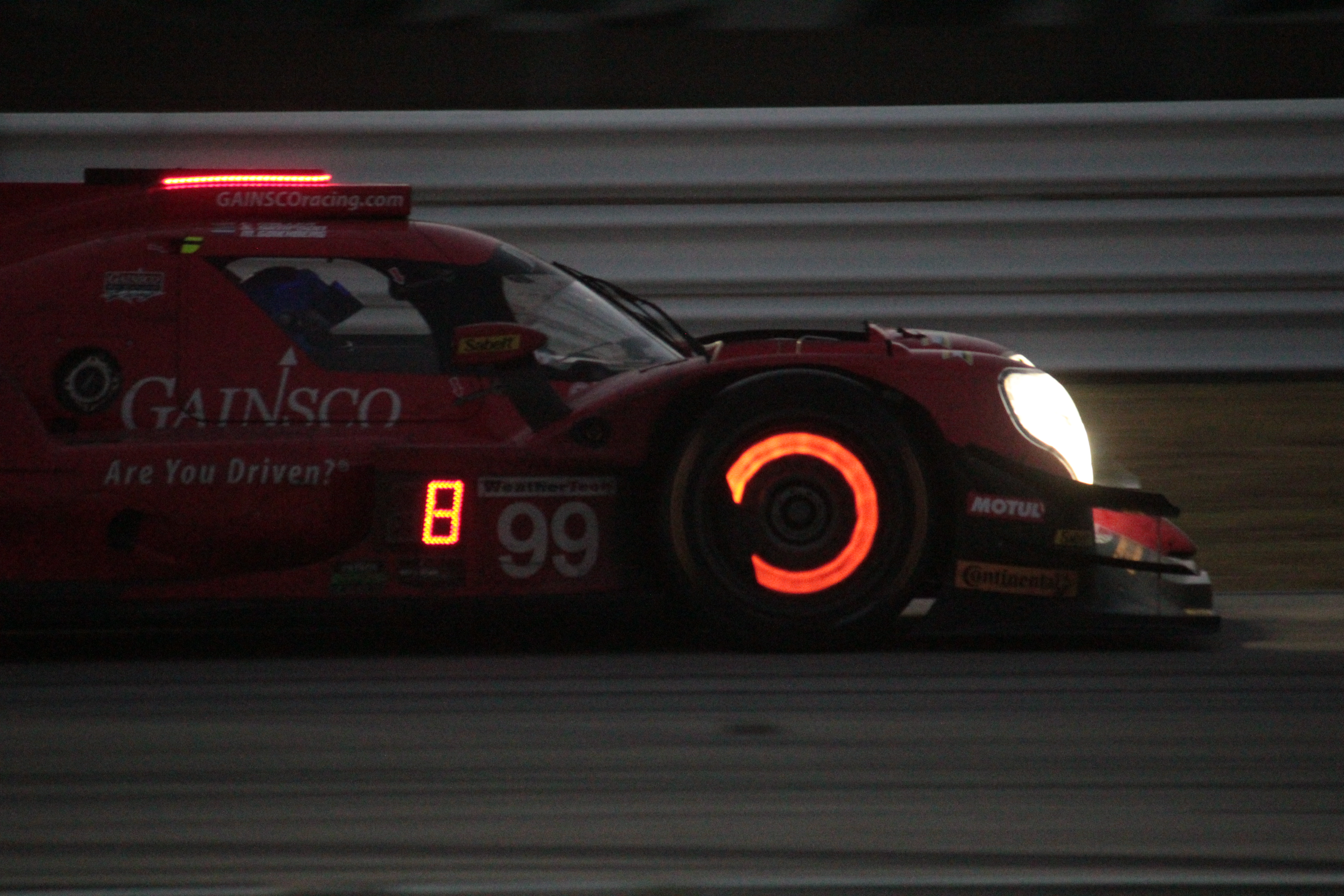
Front disc brakes glowing during a race

In racing and high-performance road cars, other disc materials have been employed. Reinforced carbon discs and pads inspired by aircraft braking systems such as those used on Concorde were introduced in Formula One by Brabham in conjunction with Dunlop in 1976. Carbon–carbon braking is now used in most top-level motorsport worldwide, reducing unsprung weight, giving better frictional performance and improved structural properties at high temperatures, compared to cast iron. Carbon brakes have occasionally been applied to road cars, by the French Venturi sports car manufacturer in the mid-1990s for example, but need to reach a very high operating temperature before becoming truly effective and so are not well suited to road use. The extreme heat generated in these systems is visible during night racing, especially on shorter tracks. It is not uncommon to see the brake discs glowing red during use.

=== Ceramic composites ===
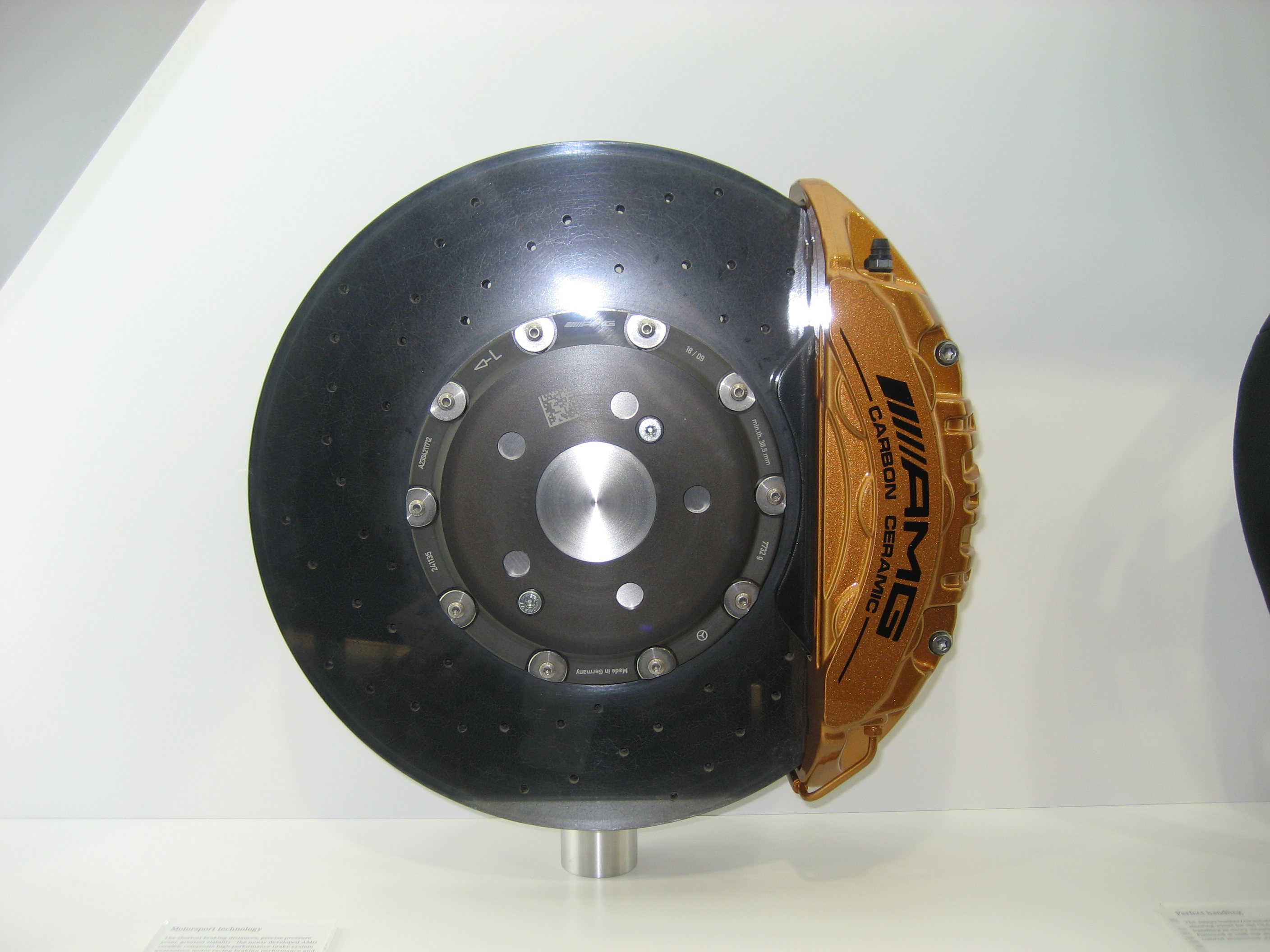
Mercedes-AMG carbon ceramic brake

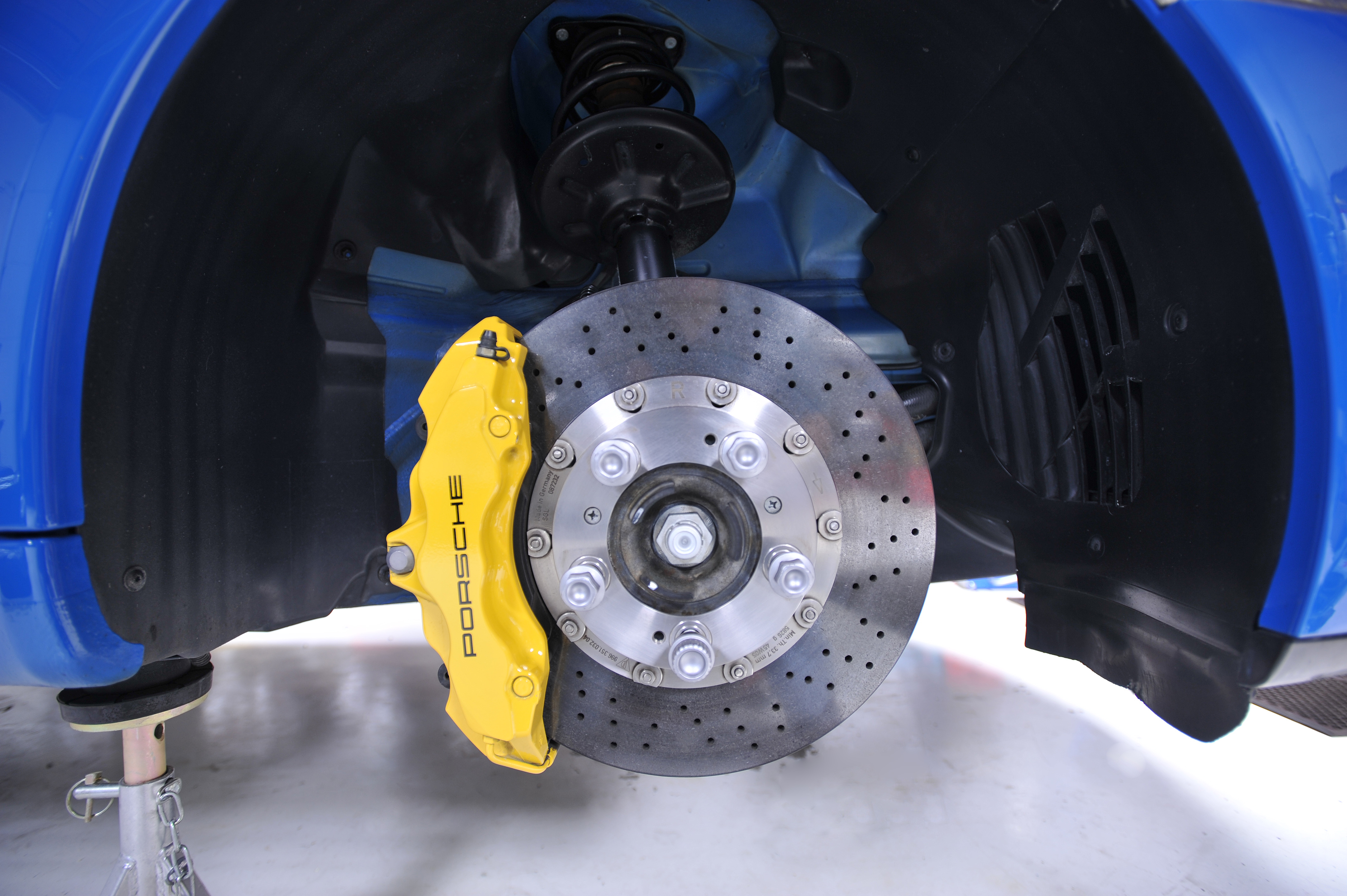
Porsche 911 Carrera S composite ceramic brake

Ceramic discs are used in some high-performance cars and heavy vehicles.

The first development of the modern ceramic brake was made by British engineers for TGV applications in 1988. The objective was to reduce weight, and the number of brakes per axle, as well as provide stable friction from high speeds and all temperatures. The result was a carbon-fiber-reinforced ceramic process which is now used in various forms for automotive, railway, and aircraft brake applications.

Due to the high heat tolerance and mechanical strength of ceramic composite discs, they are often used on exotic vehicles where the cost is not prohibitive. They are also found in industrial applications where the ceramic disc's lightweight and low-maintenance properties justify the cost. Composite brakes can withstand temperatures that would damage steel discs.

Porsche's Composite Ceramic Brakes (PCCB) are siliconized carbon fiber, with high-temperature capability, a 50% weight reduction over iron discs (hence reducing the vehicle's unsprung weight), a significant reduction in dust generation, substantially extended maintenance intervals, and enhanced durability in corrosive environments. Found on some of their more expensive models, it is also an optional brake for all street Porsches at added expense. They can be recognized by the bright yellow paintwork on the aluminum six-piston calipers. The discs are internally vented much like cast-iron ones, and cross-drilled.

=== Adjustment mechanism ===
In automotive applications, the piston seal has a square cross-section, also known as a square-cut seal.

As the piston moves in and out, the seal drags and stretches on the piston, causing the seal to twist. The seal distorts approximately 1/10 of a millimeter. The piston is allowed to move out freely, but the slight amount of drag caused by the seal stops the piston from fully retracting to its previous position when the brakes are released, and so takes up the slack caused by the wear of the brake pads, eliminating the need for return springs.

In some rear disc calipers, the parking brake activates a mechanism inside the caliper that performs some of the same functions.

=== Disc damage modes ===
Discs are usually damaged in one of four ways: scarring, cracking, warping, or excessive rusting. Service shops will sometimes respond to any disc problem by changing out the discs entirely, This is done mainly where the cost of a new disc may be lower than the cost of labor to resurface the old disc. Mechanically this is unnecessary unless the discs have reached the manufacturer's minimum recommended thickness, which would make it unsafe to use them, or vane rusting is severe (ventilated discs only). Most leading vehicle manufacturers recommend brake disc skimming (US: turning) as a solution for lateral run-out, vibration issues, and brake noises. The machining process is performed in a brake lathe, which removes a very thin layer off the disc surface to clean off minor damage and restore uniform thickness. Machining the disc as necessary will maximize the mileage out of the current discs on the vehicle.

=== Run-out ===
Run-out is measured using a dial indicator on a fixed rigid base, with the tip perpendicular to the brake disc's face. It is typically measured about 1/2 in (12.7 mm) from the outside diameter of the disc. The disc is spun. The difference between the minimum and maximum value on the dial is called lateral run-out. Typical hub/disc assembly run-out specifications for passenger vehicles are around 0.002 in (0.0508 mm). Runout can be caused either by deformation of the disc itself or by runout in the underlying wheel hub face or by contamination between the disc surface and the underlying hub mounting surface. Determining the root cause of the indicator displacement (lateral runout) requires the disassembly of the disc from the hub. Disc face runout due to hub face runout or contamination will typically have a period of 1 minimum and 1 maximum per revolution of the brake disc.

Discs can be machined to eliminate thickness variation and lateral run-out. Machining can be done in situ (on-car) or off-car (bench lathe). Both methods will eliminate the thickness variation. Machining on-car with the proper equipment can also eliminate lateral run-out due to hub-face non-perpendicularity.

Incorrect fitting can distort (warp) discs. The disc's retaining bolts (or the wheel/lug nuts, if the disc is sandwiched in place by the wheel) must be tightened progressively and evenly. The use of air tools to fasten lug nuts can be bad practice unless a torque wrench is used for final tightening. The vehicle manual will indicate the proper pattern for tightening as well as a torque rating for the bolts. Lug nuts should never be tightened in a circle. Some vehicles are sensitive to the force the bolts apply and tightening should be done with a torque wrench.

Often uneven pad transfer is confused for disc warping. The majority of brake discs diagnosed as "warped" are the result of uneven transfer of pad material. Uneven pad transfer can lead to thickness variation of the disc. When the thicker section of the disc passes between the pads, the pads will move apart and the brake pedal will raise slightly; this is pedal pulsation. The thickness variation can be felt by the driver when it is approximately 0.17 mm (0.0067 in) or greater (on automobile discs).

Thickness variation has many causes, but three primary mechanisms contribute to the propagation of disc thickness variations. The first is the improper selection of brake pads. Pads that are effective at low temperatures, such as when braking for the first time in cold weather, often are made of materials that decompose unevenly at higher temperatures. This uneven decomposition results in the uneven deposition of material onto the brake disc. Another cause of uneven material transfer is the improper break-in of a pad/disc combination. For proper break-in, the disc surface should be refreshed (either by machining the contact surface or by replacing the disc) every time the pads are changed. Once this is done, the brakes are heavily applied multiple times in succession. This creates a smooth, even interface between the pad and the disc. When this is not done properly the brake pads will see an uneven distribution of stress and heat, resulting in an uneven, seemingly random, deposition of pad material. The third primary mechanism of uneven pad material transfer is "pad imprinting." This occurs when the brake pads are heated to the point that the material begins to break down and transfer to the disc. In a properly broken-in brake system (with properly selected pads), this transfer is natural and is a major contributor to the braking force generated by the brake pads. However, if the vehicle comes to a stop and the driver continues to apply the brakes, as is customary in cars with an automatic transmission, the pads will deposit a layer of material in the shape of the brake pad. This small thickness variation can begin the cycle of uneven pad transfer.

Once the disc has some level of variation in thickness, uneven pad deposition can accelerate, sometimes resulting in changes to the crystal structure of the metal that composes the disc. As the brakes are applied, the pads slide over the varying disc surface. As the pads pass by the thicker section of the disc, they are forced outwards. The foot of the driver applied to the brake pedal naturally resists this change, and thus more force is applied to the pads. The result is that the thicker sections see higher levels of stress. This causes uneven heating of the surface of the disc, which causes two major issues. As the brake disc heats unevenly it also expands unevenly. The thicker sections of the disc expand more than the thinner sections due to seeing more heat, and thus the difference in thickness is magnified. Also, the uneven distribution of heat results in the further uneven transfer of pad material. The result is that the thicker-hotter sections receive even more pad material than the thinner-cooler sections, contributing to a further increase in the variation in the disc's thickness. In extreme situations, this uneven heating can cause the crystal structure of the disc material to change. When the hotter sections of the discs reach extremely high temperatures (1,200–1,300 °F or 649–704 °C), the metal can undergo a phase transformation and the carbon which is dissolved in the steel can precipitate out to form carbon-heavy carbide regions known as cementite. This iron carbide is very different from the cast iron the rest of the disc is composed of. It is extremely hard, brittle, and does not absorb heat well. After cementite is formed, the integrity of the disc is compromised. Even if the disc surface is machined, the cementite within the disc will not wear or absorb heat at the same rate as the cast iron surrounding it, causing the uneven thickness and heating characteristics of the disc to return.

=== Scarring ===
Scarring (US: Scoring) can occur if brake pads are not changed promptly when they reach the end of their service life and are considered worn out. Once enough of the friction material has worn away, the pad's steel backing plate (for glued pads) or the pad retainer rivets (for riveted pads) will bear upon the disc's wear surface, reducing braking power and making scratches on the disc. Generally, a moderately scarred or scored disc, which operated satisfactorily with existing brake pads, will be equally usable with new pads. If the scarring is deeper but not excessive, it can be repaired by machining off a layer of the disc's surface. This can only be done a limited number of times as the disc has a minimum rated safe thickness. The minimum thickness value is typically cast into the disc during manufacturing on the hub or the edge of the disc. In Pennsylvania, which has one of the most rigorous auto safety inspection programs in North America, an automotive disc cannot pass a safety inspection if any scoring is deeper than .015 inches (0.38 mm), and must be replaced if machining will reduce the disc below its minimum safe thickness.

To prevent scarring, it is prudent to periodically inspect the brake pads for wear. A tire rotation is a logical time for inspection, since rotation must be performed regularly based on vehicle operation time and all wheels must be removed, allowing ready visual access to the brake pads. Some types of alloy wheels and brake arrangements will provide enough open space to view the pads without removing the wheel. When practical, pads that are near the wear-out point should be replaced immediately, as complete wear-out leads to scarring damage and unsafe braking. Many disc brake pads will include some sort of soft steel spring or drag tab as part of the pad assembly, which drags on the disc when the pad is nearly worn out. This produces a moderately loud squealing noise, alerting the driver that service is required. This will not normally scar the disc if the brakes are serviced promptly. A set of pads can be considered for replacement if the thickness of the pad material is the same or less than the thickness of the backing steel. In Pennsylvania, the standard is 1/32 inch (1 mm) for riveted pads and 2/32 in (2 mm) for bonded pads.

=== Cracking ===
Cracking is limited mostly to drilled discs, which may develop small cracks around the edges of holes drilled near the edge of the disc due to the disc's uneven rate of expansion in severe-duty environments. Manufacturers that use drilled discs as OEM typically do so for two reasons: appearance, if they determine that the average owner of the vehicle model will prefer the look while not overly stressing the hardware; or as a function of reducing the unsprung weight of the brake assembly, with the engineering assumption that enough brake disc mass remains to absorb racing temperatures and stresses. A brake disc is a heat sink, but the loss of heat sink mass may be balanced by increased surface area to radiate away heat. Small hairline cracks may appear in any cross-drilled metal disc as a normal wear mechanism, but in severe cases, the disc will fail catastrophically. No repair is possible for the cracks, and if the cracking becomes severe, the disc must be replaced. These cracks occur due to the phenomenon of low cycle fatigue as a result of repeated hard braking.

=== Rusting ===
The discs are commonly made from cast iron and a certain amount of surface rust is normal. The disc contact area for the brake pads will be kept clean by regular use, but a vehicle that is stored for an extended period can develop significant rust in the contact area that may reduce braking power for a time until the rusted layer is worn off again. Rusting can also lead to disc warping when brakes are re-activated after storage because of differential heating between unrusted areas left covered by pads and rust around the majority of the disc area surface. Over time, vented brake discs may develop severe rust corrosion inside the ventilation slots, compromising the strength of the structure and needing replacement.

== Calipers ==
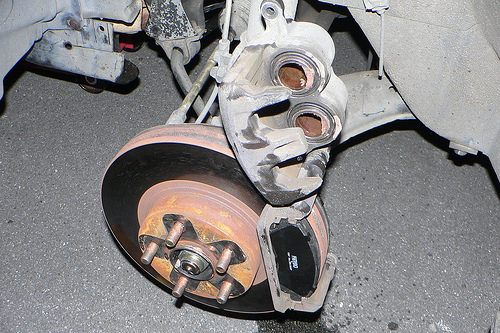
Subaru Legacy disc brake caliper (twin-piston, floating) removed from its mounting for changing pads

The brake caliper is the assembly that houses the brake pads and pistons. The pistons are usually made of plastic, aluminium or chrome-plated steel.

Calipers are of two types, floating or fixed. A fixed caliper does not move relative to the disc and is thus less tolerant of disc imperfections. It uses one or more pairs of opposing pistons to clamp from each side of the disc and is more complex and expensive than a floating caliper.

A floating caliper (also called a "sliding caliper") moves side to side to the disc, along a line parallel to the axis of rotation of the disc; a piston on one side of the disc pushes the inner brake pad until it makes contact with the braking surface, then pulls the caliper body with the outer brake pad so the pressure is applied to both sides of the disc. Floating caliper (single piston) designs are subject to sticking failure, caused by dirt or corrosion entering at least one mounting mechanism and stopping its normal movement. This can lead to the caliper's pads rubbing on the disc when the brake is not engaged or engaging it at an angle. Sticking can result from infrequent vehicle use, failure of a seal or rubber protection boot allowing debris entry, dry-out of the grease in the mounting mechanism, and subsequent moisture incursion leading to corrosion, or some combination of these factors. Consequences may include reduced fuel efficiency, extreme heating of the disc, or excessive wear on the affected pad. A sticking front caliper may also cause steering vibration.

Another type of floating caliper is a swinging caliper. Instead of a pair of horizontal bolts that allow the caliper to move straight in and out respective to the car body, a swinging caliper utilizes a single, vertical pivot bolt located somewhere behind the axle centerline. When the driver presses the brakes, the brake piston pushes on the inside brake pad and rotates the whole caliper inward, when viewed from the top. Because the swinging caliper's piston angle changes relative to the disc, this design uses wedge-shaped pads that are narrower in the rear on the outside and narrower in the front on the inside.

Various types of brake calipers are also used on bicycle rim brakes.

=== Pistons and cylinders ===
The most common caliper design uses a single hydraulically-actuated piston within a cylinder, although some high-performance cars come equipped with brakes from the OEM that use as many as ten pistons. Modern cars use different hydraulic circuits to actuate the brakes on each set of wheels as a safety measure. The hydraulic design also helps multiply braking force. The number of pistons in a caliper is often referred to as the number of 'pots', so if a vehicle has 'six pot' calipers it means that each caliper houses six pistons.

Brake failure can result from the failure of the piston to retract, which is usually a consequence of not operating the vehicle during prolonged storage outdoors in adverse conditions. On high-mileage vehicles, the piston seals may leak, which must be promptly corrected.

== Brake pads ==
Brake pads are designed for high friction with brake pad material embedded in the disc in the process of bedding while wearing evenly. Friction can be divided into two parts. They are: adhesive and abrasive.

Depending on the properties of the material of both the pad and the disc and the configuration and the usage, pad and disc wear rates will vary considerably. The properties that determine material wear involve trade-offs between performance and longevity.

The brake pads must usually be replaced regularly (depending on pad material and driving style), and some are equipped with a mechanism that alerts drivers that replacement is needed, such as a thin piece of soft metal that rubs against the disc when the pads are too thin causing the brakes to squeal, a soft metal tab embedded in the pad material that closes an electric circuit and lights a warning light when the brake pad gets thin, or an electronic sensor.

Generally, road-going vehicles have two brake pads per caliper, while up to six are installed on each racing caliper, with varying frictional properties in a staggered pattern for optimum performance.

Early brake pads (and linings) contained asbestos, producing dust that should not be inhaled. Although newer pads can be made of ceramics, Kevlar, and other plastics, inhalation of brake dust should still be avoided regardless of material.

== Common problems ==
=== Squeal ===
Sometimes a loud noise or high-pitched squeal occurs when the brakes are applied. It mostly occurs on cars which were produced or acquired some time ago. Most brake squeal is produced by vibration (resonance instability) of the brake components, especially the pads and discs (known as force-coupled excitation). This type of squeal should not negatively affect stopping performance. Techniques include adding chamfer pads to the contact points between the caliper pistons and the pads, the bonding insulators (damping material) to the pad backing plate, the brake shims between the brake pad and pistons, etc. All should be coated with an extremely high temperature, high solids lubricant to help reduce squeal. This allows the metal-to-metal parts to move independently of each other and thereby eliminate the buildup of energy that can create a frequency that is heard as brake squeal, groan, or growl. It is inherent that some pads are going to squeal more given the type of the pad and its usage case. Pads typically rated to withstand very high temperatures for extended periods tend to produce high amounts of friction leading to more noise during brake application.

Cold weather combined with high early-morning humidity (dew) often worsens brake squeal. However, the squeal generally stops when the lining reaches regular operating temperatures. This more strongly affects pads meant to be used at higher temperatures. Dust on the brakes may also cause squeal and commercial brake cleaning products are designed to remove dirt and other contaminants. Pads without a proper amount of transfer material could also squeal, this can be remedied by bedding or re-bedding the brake pads to brake discs.

Some lining wear indicators, located either as a semi-metallic layer within the brake pad material or with an external "sensor", are also designed to squeal when the lining is due for replacement. The typical external sensor is fundamentally different from the noises described above (when the brakes are applied) because the wear sensor noise typically occurs when the brakes are not used. The wear sensor may only create a squeal under braking when it first begins to indicate wear but is still a fundamentally different sound and pitch.

=== Judder or shimmy ===
A brake judder is usually perceived by the driver as minor to severe vibrations transferred through the chassis during braking.

The judder phenomenon can be classified into two distinct subgroups: hot (or thermal), or cold judder.

Hot judder is usually produced as a result of longer, more moderate braking from high speed where the vehicle does not come to a complete stop. It commonly occurs when a motorist decelerates from speeds of around 120 km/h (75 mph) to about 60 km/h (37 mph), which results in severe vibrations being transmitted to the driver. These vibrations are the result of uneven thermal distributions, or hot spots. Hot spots are classified as concentrated thermal regions that alternate between both sides of a disc that distort it in such a way that produces a sinusoidal waviness around its edges. Once the brake pads (friction material/brake lining) come in contact with the sinusoidal surface during braking, severe vibrations are induced, and can produce hazardous conditions for the person driving the vehicle.

Cold judder, on the other hand, is the result of uneven disc wear patterns or disc thickness variation (DTV). These variations in the disc surface are usually the result of extensive vehicle road usage. DTV is usually attributed to the following causes: waviness and roughness of disc surface, misalignment of axis run-out, elastic deflection, wear and friction material transfers. Either type could potentially be fixed by ensuring a clean mounting surface on either side of the brake disc between the wheel hub and brake disc hub before usage and paying attention to imprinting after extended usage by leaving the brake pedal heavily depressed at the end of heavy usage. Sometimes a bed in procedure can clean and minimize DTV and lay a new even transfer layer between the pad and brake disc. However, it will not eliminate hot spots or excessive run-out.

=== Dust ===
When braking force is applied, the act of abrasive friction between the brake pad and the disc wears both the disc and pad away. The brake dust that is seen deposited on wheels, calipers, and other braking system components consists mostly of the disc material. Brake dust can damage the finish of most wheels if not washed off. Generally, a brake pad that aggressively abrades more disc material away, such as metallic pads, will create more brake dust. Some higher-performing pads for track use or towing use may wear away much quicker than a typical pad, thus causing more dust due to the increased brake disc and brake pad wear.

=== Brake fade ===
Brake fade is a phenomenon that decreases braking efficiency. It causes the braking power to reduce. When this occurs, the driver feels that the brakes are not being applied with the force they were being applied at the time of starting. This occurs due to the heating of brake pads. The heated brake pads emit some gaseous substances which cover the area between the disc and the brake pads. These gases disturb the contact between the brake pads and the disc and hence decrease the braking effectiveness.

== Patents ==
- GB 190226407 Lanchester Frederick William Improvements in the Brake Mechanism of Power-propelled Road Vehicles 1903-10-15
- US 1721370 Boughton Edward Bishop Brake for use on vehicles 1929-07-16
- GB 365069 Rubury John Meredith Improvements in control gear for hydraulically operated devices and particularly brakes for vehicles 1932-01-06
- GB 377478 Hall Frederick Harold Improvements in wheel cylinders for hydraulic brakes 1932-07-28
- US 1954534 Norton Raymond J. Brake 1934-04-10
- US 1959049 Buus Niels Peter Valdemar Friction Brake 1934-05-15
- US 2028488 Avery William Leicester Brake 1936-02-21
- US 2084216 Poage Robert A. and Poage Marlin Z. V-type brake for motor vehicles 1937-06-15
- US 2140752 La Brie Brake 1938-12-20
- DE 695921 Borgwar Carl Friedrich Wilhelm Antriebsvorrichtung mit hydraulischem Gestaenge... 1940-09-06
- US 2366093 Forbes Joseph A. Brake 1944-12-26
- US 2375855 Lambert Homer T. Multiple disk brake 1945-05-15
- US 2405219 Lambert Homer T. Disk brake 1946-08-06
- US 2416091 Fitch Fluid pressure control mechanism 1947-02-12
- US 2466990 Johnson Wade C, Trishman Harry A, Stratton Edgar H. Single disk brake 1949-04-12
- US 2485032 Bryant Brake apparatus 1949-10-08
- US 2535763 Tucker Corp. Fluid Pressure Operated Disk Brake 1950-12-26
- US 2544849 Martin Hydraulic brake automatic adjuster 1951-03-13
- US 2591793 Dubois Device for adjusting the return travel of fluid actuated means 1952-04-08
- US 2746575 Kinchin Disc brakes for road and other vehicles 1956-05-22
- ES 195467Y Sanglas Freno de disco para motociclos 1975-07-16

== See also ==
- Balancing machine
- Brake bleeding
- Brake fluid
- Disc-lock
