= Disc-lock =

Portable security device for motorcycles

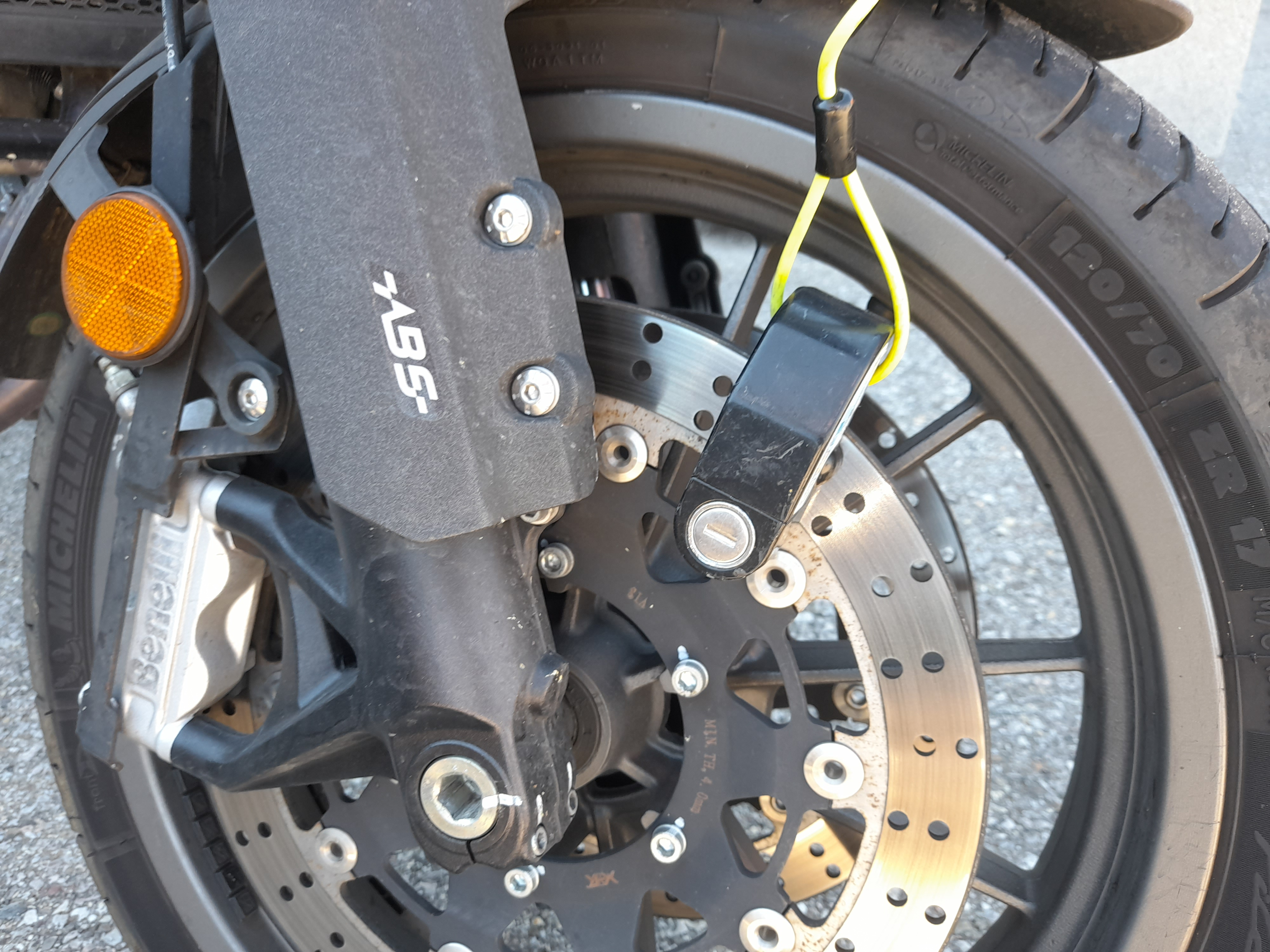
Disc-lock on the front wheel of a motor cycle. The yellow cable goes up to the gas handle as a reminder to remove the disc-lock before driving.

A disc lock is a portable security device for motorcycles and scooters. Disc-locks use the holes in a motorcycle's or scooter's brake disc. A locking pin passes through the hole in the brake disc and locks to the other side of the lock, using either a pushdown-and-click locking mechanism or a more robust double-locking mechanism. When in place, the disc-lock discourages theft by blocking the vehicle from being moved in either forward or reverse direction.
