= Band brake =

Type of brake

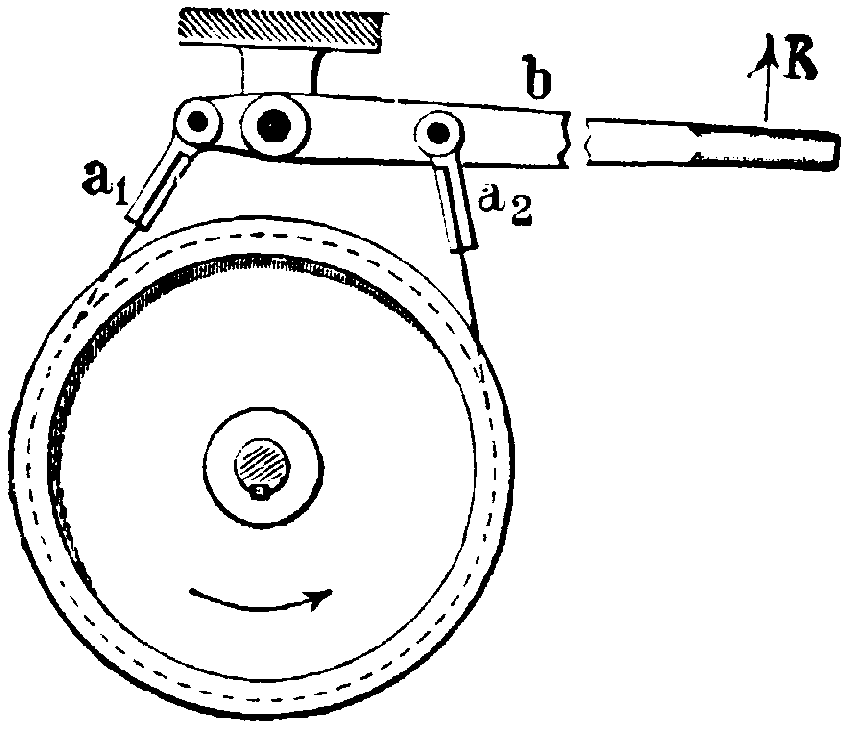

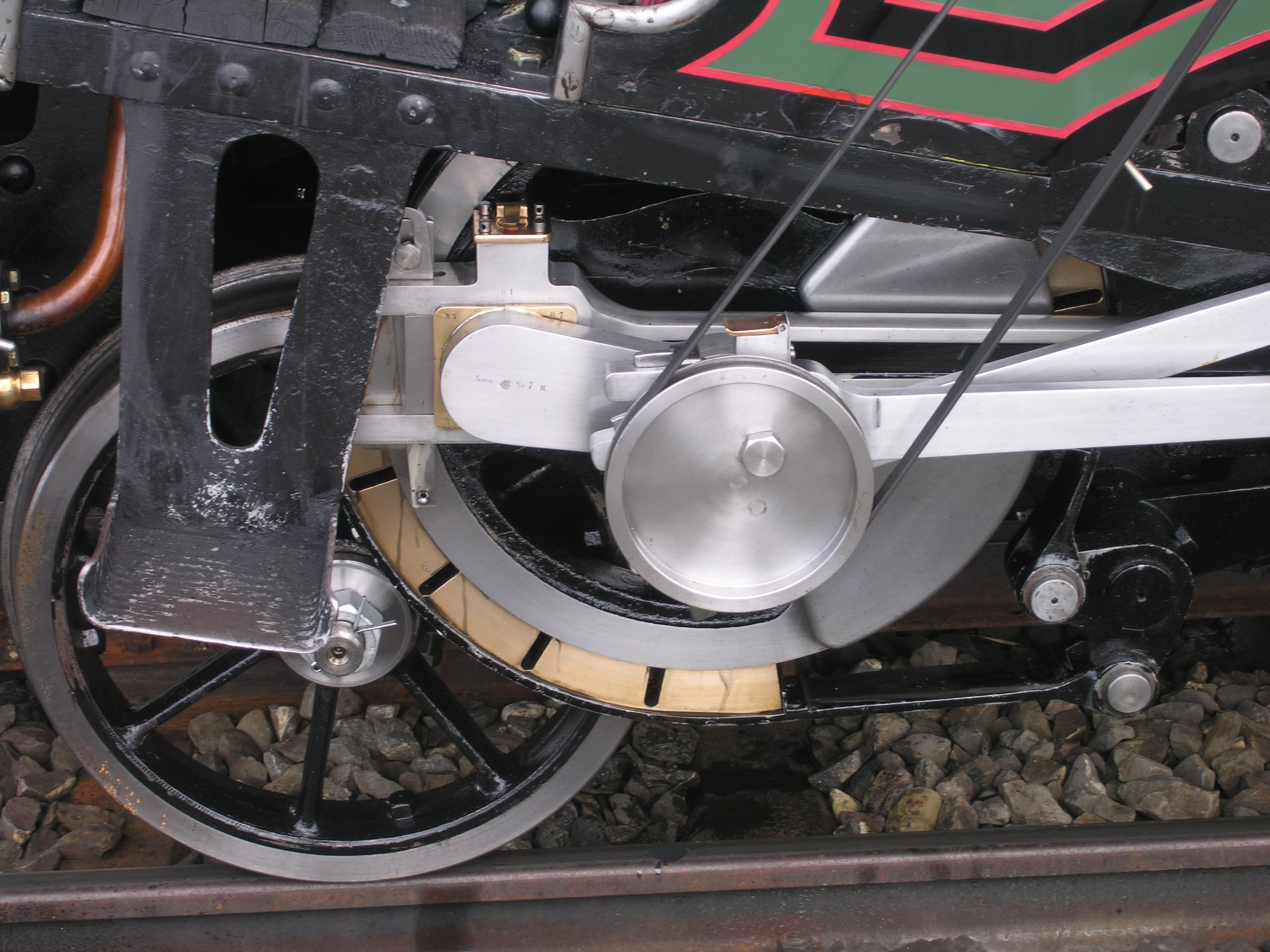
A band brake fitted to an 1873 steam locomotive of the Rigi Railways

A band brake is a primary or secondary brake, consisting of a band of friction material that tightens concentrically around a cylindrical piece of equipment or train wheel to either prevent it from rotating (a static or "holding" brake), or to slow it (a dynamic brake).

== Uses ==
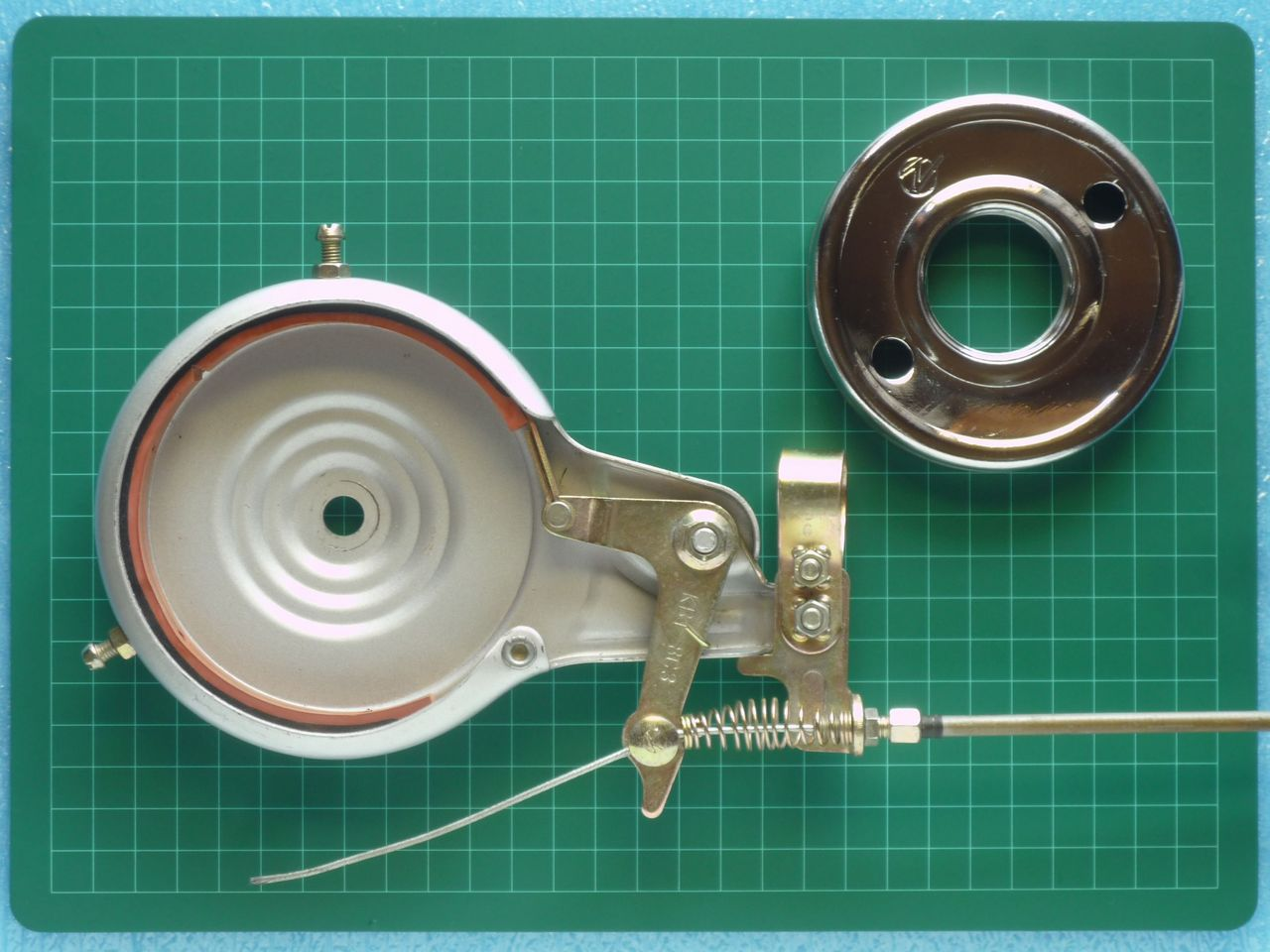
Band brake for rear wheel of a bicycle

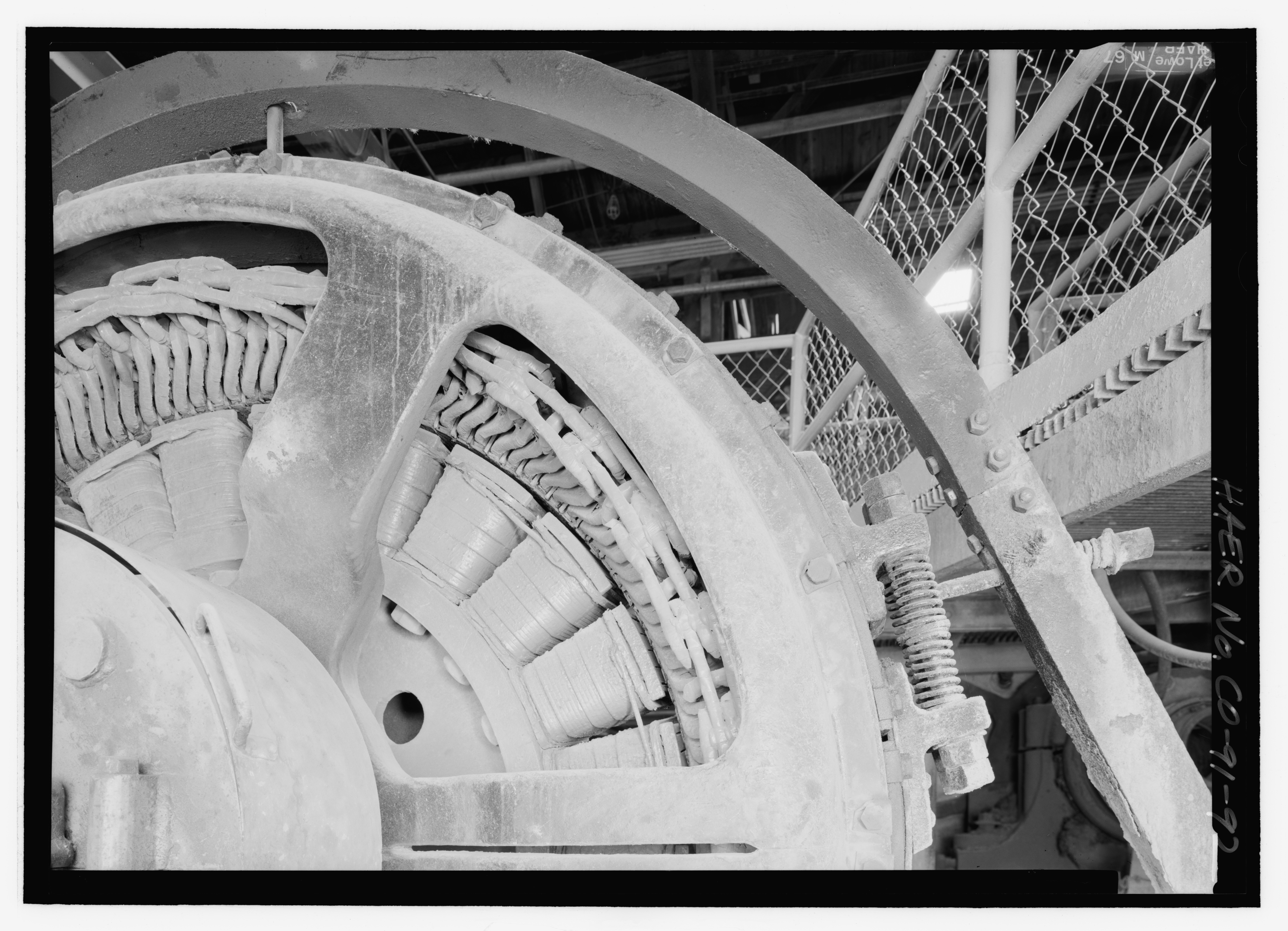
A GE electric motor with band brake to control its speed

Band brakes were common on winch drums and chain saws and are also used for some bicycle brakes.

Band brakes were commonly used to control the winding drum on railway inclines that lowered loaded wagons while raising empty ones over a steep slope.

A former application was the locking of gear rings in epicyclic gearing. In modern automatic transmissions this task has been largely taken over by multiple-plate clutches or multiple-plate brakes.

== Features ==
A band brake is a flexible band which wraps around part or all of the outside surface of a wheel or drum. One end of the band is anchored in place, while the other is attached to a lever. Pressing on the lever brings the band into contact with the surface of the wheel and the friction causes the wheel's rotation to slow.

Band brakes can be simple, compact, rugged, and can generate high force with a light input force. However, band brakes are prone to grabbing or chatter and loss of brake force when hot. These problems are inherent with the design and thus limit where band brakes are a good solution.

== Effectiveness ==
One way to describe the effectiveness of the brake is as $e^{\mu \theta}$, where $\mu$ is the coefficient of friction between band and drum, and $\theta$ is the angle of wrap. With a large $\mu \theta$, the brake is very effective and requires low input force to achieve high brake force, but is also very sensitive to changes in $\mu$. For example, light rust on the drum may cause the brake to "grab" or chatter, water may cause the brake to slip, and rising temperatures in braking may cause the coefficient of friction to drop slightly but in turn cause brake force to drop greatly. Using a band material with low $\mu$ increases the input force required to achieve a given brake force, but some low-$\mu$ materials also have more consistent $\mu$ across the range of working temperatures.

== See also ==
- Bicycle band brake
- Prony brake, a form of band brake used for the measurement of torque and horsepower.
